= List of people, items and places in Norse mythology =

Norse mythology includes a diverse array of people, places, creatures, and other mythical elements.

== Places ==
- Álfheim
- Asgard
- Bifröst
- Bilskirnir
- Breidablik
- Elivagar
- Fyris Wolds
- Gandvik
- Ginnungagap
- Hel
- Hlidskjalf
- Hvergelmir
- Járnviðr
- Jötunheimr
- Leipter River
- Kormet
- Midgard
- Muspelheim
- Náströnd
- Niðavellir
- Niflheim
- Ormet
- Reidgotaland
- Sessrúmnir
- Slidr River
- Svartálfaheim
- Útgarðar
- Valhalla
- Vanaheim
- Vimur
- Yggdrasil

== Events ==
- Æsir–Vanir War
- Battle of Brávellir
- Battle on the Ice of Lake Vänern
- Ēostre
- Fimbulwinter
- Hjaðningavíg
- Mōdraniht
- Ragnarök
- Rheda (mythology)
- Yule

== Artifacts ==
- Balmung
- Brisingamen
- Draupnir
- Dromi
- Eitr
- Gjallarhorn
- Gleipnir
- Gram
- Gullinbursti
- Gungnir
- Hringhorni
- Læðingur
- Mjölnir
- Naglfar
- Skíðblaðnir
- Svalinn
- Tyrfing
- Well of Urd

== People ==
- Adils
- Alaric and Eric
- Arngrim
- Ask and Embla
- Aun
- Berserkers
- Bödvar Bjarki
- Dag the Wise
- Domalde
- Domar
- Dyggve
- Egil One-Hand
- Fafnir
- Fjölnir
- Gudrun
- Harald Hildetand
- Ingjald
- Ivar Vidfamne
- Lif and Lifthrasir
- Nór
- Ohthere
- Ragnar Lodbrok
- Rerir
- Raum the Old
- Shieldmaiden
- Sigi
- Sigmund
- Signy
- Sigurd
- Sigurd Hring
- Skirnir
- Skjöld
- Starkad
- Sveigðir
- Volsung
- Yngvi and Alf

== Dwarves ==
Many dwarves are named in the poem Völuspá and repeated in Gylfaginning

- Alvíss
- Andvari
- Billingr
- Brokkr
- Dainn
- Durinn
- Dúrnir
- Dvalinn
- Eitri
- Fafnir
- Fjalar and Galar
- Gandalf
- Hreiðmarr
- Litr
- Mótsognir
- Norðri, Suðri, Austri and Vestri
- Ótr
- Regin
- Sindari
- Sons of Ivaldi

== Other assorted beings ==
- Álfar
- Auðumbla
- Dökkálfar
- Draugr
- Fenrisulfr
- Garmr
- Geri and Freki
- Gullinbursti
- Gultopp
- Hati
- Hugin and Munin
- Jörmungandr
- Ljósálfar
- Móinn
- Níðhöggr
- The Norns
- Ratatoskr
- Skoll
- Sleipnir
- Surtr
- Svadilfari
- Svartálfar
- Tanngrisnir and Tanngnjóstr
- Valkyrie

== See also ==
- List of Norse gods
- List of jötnar in Norse mythology
- The Nine Worlds of Norse mythology
- Numbers in Norse mythology
- Norse mythological influences on later literature
- Rök runestone
