= Norse Mythology (book) =

2017 book by Neil Gaiman

- Original hardcover of Norse Mythology
- Author: Neil Gaiman
- Language: English
- Publisher: Bloomsbury
- Publication date: 7 February 2017
- Publication place: United Kingdom
- ISBN: 1-526-63482-1

Norse Mythology is a 2017 book by Neil Gaiman, which retells several stories from Norse mythology. In the introduction, Gaiman describes where his fondness for the source material comes from. The book received positive reviews from critics.

== Myths ==
Each chapter introduces some mythological figures (usually gods or jötnar, glossed by Gaiman as "giants") and/or tells some stories.

=== The players ===
The three most common gods to feature in the stories, Odin, Thor and Loki, are presented.

=== Before the beginning, and after ===
From Ginnungagap, the primordial space between the Niflheim and the Muspelheim, two living beings are created: Ymir (ancestor of all jötnar) and the cow Auðumbla, whose milk feeds Ymir. In turn, Audhumbla creates Búri (ancestor of all gods), whose grandchildren Odin, Vili and Vé eventually kill Ymir. Using the various parts of his enormous body, they create the current world; they also create the first humans, Ask and Embla, to populate Midgard.

=== Yggdrasil and the nine worlds ===
The world tree Yggdrasil is introduced, which binds together the various worlds of the Norse cosmology, including Ásgarð, Vanaheim and Jötunheimr, the realms of, the Æsir gods, the Vanir gods and the jötnar respectively.

=== Mimir's head and Odin's eye ===
Odin sacrifices his eye in order to be able to drink from the well of Wisdom of his uncle Mimir. As a consequence of the Æsir–Vanir War, Mimir is sent to the Vanir, who eventually kill him and send his head back to Odin.

=== The treasures of the gods ===
Loki cuts the hair of Sif (Thor's wife). In order to make up for the damage, he makes a wager between two groups of dwarf smiths, the Sons of Ivaldi and the brothers Brokkr and Eitri, who create many other treasure for the gods, including Mjölnir (Thor's hammer).

=== The master builder ===
A mysterious builder, together with his horse Svaðilfari, offers to build a giant wall around Asgard, alone and at an extremely fast speed, in exchange for an exaggerate price: the sun, the moon and the goddess Freya. Loki convinces the gods to accept the wager, thinking the builder will never make it in time; after they realise that the wall is almost built, Loki tricks the builder's horse by taking the form of a mare, preventing him to complete the wall in time and denying the payment. The builder, revealed to be a jötunn in disguise, is killed by Thor, while Loki, in mare form, gives birth to Sleipnir.

=== The children of Loki ===
Loki has three monstrous children with the gýgr Angrboða. The other gods seize them from the jötnar and try to prevent them from causing future troubles: the wolf Fenrir is bound forever with the chain Gleipnir (at the price of Týr's hand); the sea serpent Jörmungandr is tossed in the ocean; and Hel is appointed by Odin as the ruler of the realm of the dead.

=== Freya's unusual wedding ===
After stealing Thor's hammer, the jötunn Thrymr asks the hand of Freya in marriage as a condition to return it to its owner. Loki helps Thor to dress as a goddess and trick the jötunn into preparing the marriage, where Thor kills Thrymr and recovers his hammer.

=== The mead of poets ===
In order to seal their truce, the Aesir and the Vanir use their saliva to create an extremely wise being called Kvasir. When Kvasir visits the dwarves Fjalar and Galar, they kill him and create a magic mead out of his blood. After the dwarfs kills the jötunn Gillingr and his wife, they are in turn tortured by Gillingr's son Suttungr and forced to give him the mead. Odin tricks Suttungr's daughter Gunnlöd and brings the mead back to Asgard.

=== Thor's journey to the land of the giants ===
Thor and Loki spend the night at a farmers' house, sharing the meat of their mythical goats; Loki tricks the boy Tjalvi into eating the bone marrow and then convince Thor, who want to punish the family, to take him and his sister Röskva as servants. They travel together to the castle of Utgarda-Loki (already met on the way under the fake appearance of the jötunn Skrymir), where they are tricked to compete in various contests they cannot win. After explaining that everything was just an illusion, and before Thor can take his revenge, Utgarda-Loki and his castle vanishes.

=== The apples of immortality ===
As a result of a fight with Loki, the jötunn Thiazi captures Idunn, keeper of the apples of immortality. Loki manages to bring Idunn back and is chased by Thiazi, who is killed by the other gods just before he can reach Asgard. His daughter Skadi seeks vengeance but she is appeased by the gods in several ways, including a marriage with Njord.

=== The story of Gerd and Frey ===
The god Frey falls in love with the gýgr Gerð and becomes suddenly apathetic and depressed. On requests from the other gods, Skírnir offers to help Frey in exchange of his sword: he travels to the house of her father Gymir and managed to convince Gerd to marry Frey in Barri.

=== Hymir and Thor's fishing expedition ===
In order to give a feast for them in his hall, the sea jötunn Aegir requires the gods to provide him with a giant cauldron to brew ale for all of them. On Tyr's suggestion, Thor travels to the jötunn Hymir and goes fishing with him to obtain his cauldron.

=== The death of Balder ===
Balder has recurring nightmares that he will die soon. His mother Frigg makes sure that he becomes almost invulnerable, but Loki discovers his only weakness and tricks Höðr into killing his brother.

=== The last days of Loki ===
After a flyting with the gods, Loki escapes but he is chased and brought to justice. Váli, son of Loki, is turned into a wolf and made to kill his brother Narfi. Loki is then bound with Narfi's entrails with a snake dripping venom on his face; his wife Sigyn remains by his side and uses a bowl to catch the venom.

=== Ragnarok: The final destiny of the gods ===
Loki and Fenrir are freed and, together with Jörmungandr, Hel's legions and the jötnar, fight the gods in a final battle, which destroys most of the world and kill almost every participant. The only gods to survive are Módi and Magni (sons of Thor) and Váli and Vidar (sons of Odin), while Balder and Hod manage to return from the Underworld. Two humans, Lif and Lifthrasir, survive the destruction and will eventually give rise to a new generation.

== Reception ==
Norse Mythology was generally well received by critics, with some citing the prose as a strength. Kirkus Reviews said that Gaiman's description is rich and atmospheric. The Washington Post's Michael Dirda said that, although Gaiman's short, clipped sentences usually seem better suited to children's fiction, his retellings were gripping and strongly characterised. Peter Fields of Midwestern State University wrote positively about the simplicity and clarity of Gaiman's language, and indicated that the book's thematic material demonstrated his growth as a writer.

Some writers compared his interpretation of the characters to the original tales. Fields said that Norse Mythology drew attention to eccentric aspects of the folklore often neglected from other popular adaptations, like Marvel Comics' depiction of Thor. Writing for The Guardian, classicist Natalie Haynes described the work as egalitarian, making space for the popular and lesser known aspects of the mythology.

== Adaptations ==
A ninety-minute audio adaptation was broadcast by BBC Radio 4 on Boxing Day 2018 featuring Derek Jacobi as Odin, Colin Morgan as Loki, Natalie Dormer as Freya, and Nathaniel Martello-White as Thor, with the stories narrated by Diana Rigg in the guise of an unexpected visitor, "Mrs. Njordsdottir", keeping an inquisitive young boy company in hospital during a blizzard. Gaiman himself was heard in a cameo role as a radio announcement.

An audiobook version was released in February 2017, narrated by Gaiman. The New York Times described his narration as "seductive".

=== Comic book ===
Dark Horse Comics released an adaptation of the book as an eighteen-issue series. P. Craig Russell provided the scripts, layouts and covers for each issue. Art and colors were from a variety of artists, including Mike Mignola, Jerry Ordway, and Dave Stewart. To mark the release of the first issue, a special edition cover by Bill Sienkiewicz was released along with a signed variant. Variant covers are by David Mack.

Issue	Release date	Story	Art	Colors	Collection
FCBD 2020; Critical Role / Norse Mythology	August 12, 2020	Prologue	P. Craig Russell	Lovern Kindzierski	Norse Mythology; VOLUME 1 RELEASE DATE: March 24, 2021; ISBN 9781506718743
I #1	October 7, 2020	Yggdrasil and the Nine Worlds	P. Craig Russell	Lovern Kindzierski	Norse Mythology; VOLUME 1 RELEASE DATE: March 24, 2021; ISBN 9781506718743
I #1	October 7, 2020	Mimir's Head and Odin's Eye	Mike Mignola	Dave Stewart	Norse Mythology; VOLUME 1 RELEASE DATE: March 24, 2021; ISBN 9781506718743
I #1	October 7, 2020	The Treasures of the Gods (part 1)	Jerry Ordway	Lovern Kindzierski	Norse Mythology; VOLUME 1 RELEASE DATE: March 24, 2021; ISBN 9781506718743
I #2	November 4, 2020	The Treasures of the Gods (part 2)	Jerry Ordway	Lovern Kindzierski	Norse Mythology; VOLUME 1 RELEASE DATE: March 24, 2021; ISBN 9781506718743
I #3	December 9, 2020	The Master Builder (part 1)	Piotr Kowalski	Lovern Kindzierski	Norse Mythology; VOLUME 1 RELEASE DATE: March 24, 2021; ISBN 9781506718743
I #4	January 6, 2020	The Master Builder (part 2)	Piotr Kowalski	Lovern Kindzierski	Norse Mythology; VOLUME 1 RELEASE DATE: March 24, 2021; ISBN 9781506718743
I #4	January 6, 2020	The Children of Loki (part 1)	David Rubín		Norse Mythology; VOLUME 1 RELEASE DATE: March 24, 2021; ISBN 9781506718743
I #5	February 10, 2021	The Children of Loki (part 2)	David Rubín		Norse Mythology; VOLUME 1 RELEASE DATE: March 24, 2021; ISBN 9781506718743
I #5	February 10, 2021	Freya's Unusual Wedding (part 1)	Jill Thompson		Norse Mythology; VOLUME 1 RELEASE DATE: March 24, 2021; ISBN 9781506718743
I #6	March 10, 2021	Freya's Unusual Wedding (part 2)	Jill Thompson		Norse Mythology; VOLUME 1 RELEASE DATE: March 24, 2021; ISBN 9781506718743
II #1	June 16, 2021	The Mead of Poets	Matt Horak	Lovern Kindzierski	Norse Mythology; VOLUME 2 RELEASE DATE: March 30, 2022; ISBN 9781506722177
II #2	July 14, 2021	The Mead of Poets	Matt Horak	Lovern Kindzierski	Norse Mythology; VOLUME 2 RELEASE DATE: March 30, 2022; ISBN 9781506722177
II #3	August 18, 2021	Thor's Journey to the Land of the Giants	Mark Buckingham	Lovern Kindzierski	Norse Mythology; VOLUME 2 RELEASE DATE: March 30, 2022; ISBN 9781506722177
II #4	September 15, 2021	Thor's Journey to the Land of the Giants	Mark Buckingham	Lovern Kindzierski	Norse Mythology; VOLUME 2 RELEASE DATE: March 30, 2022; ISBN 9781506722177
II #5	October 13, 2021	The Apples of Immortality	Gabriel Hernández Walta	Lovern Kindzierski	Norse Mythology; VOLUME 2 RELEASE DATE: March 30, 2022; ISBN 9781506722177
II #6	November 17, 2021	The Story of Gerd and Frey	Gabriel Hernández Walta, Sandy Jarrell	Lovern Kindzierski	Norse Mythology; VOLUME 2 RELEASE DATE: March 30, 2022; ISBN 9781506722177
III #1	February 9, 2022	Hymir and Thor's Fishing Expedition	David Rubín		Norse Mythology; VOLUME 3 RELEASE DATE: January 25, 2023; ISBN 9781506726410
III #2	March 9, 2022	The Death of Balder (Part 1)	David Rubín, Colleen Doran		Norse Mythology; VOLUME 3 RELEASE DATE: January 25, 2023; ISBN 9781506726410
III #3	April 13, 2022	The Death of Balder (Part 2)	Colleen Doran		Norse Mythology; VOLUME 3 RELEASE DATE: January 25, 2023; ISBN 9781506726410
III #4	May 11, 2022	The Last Days of Loki	Galen Showman		Norse Mythology; VOLUME 3 RELEASE DATE: January 25, 2023; ISBN 9781506726410
III #5	June 15, 2022	Ragnarok: The Final Destiny of the God (Part 1)	P. Craig Russell	Galen Showman	Norse Mythology; VOLUME 3 RELEASE DATE: January 25, 2023; ISBN 9781506726410
III #6	July 13, 2022	Ragnarok: The Final Destiny of the God (Part 2)	Galen Showman		Norse Mythology; VOLUME 3 RELEASE DATE: January 25, 2023; ISBN 9781506726410
