= Eitri =

Dwarf in Norse mythology

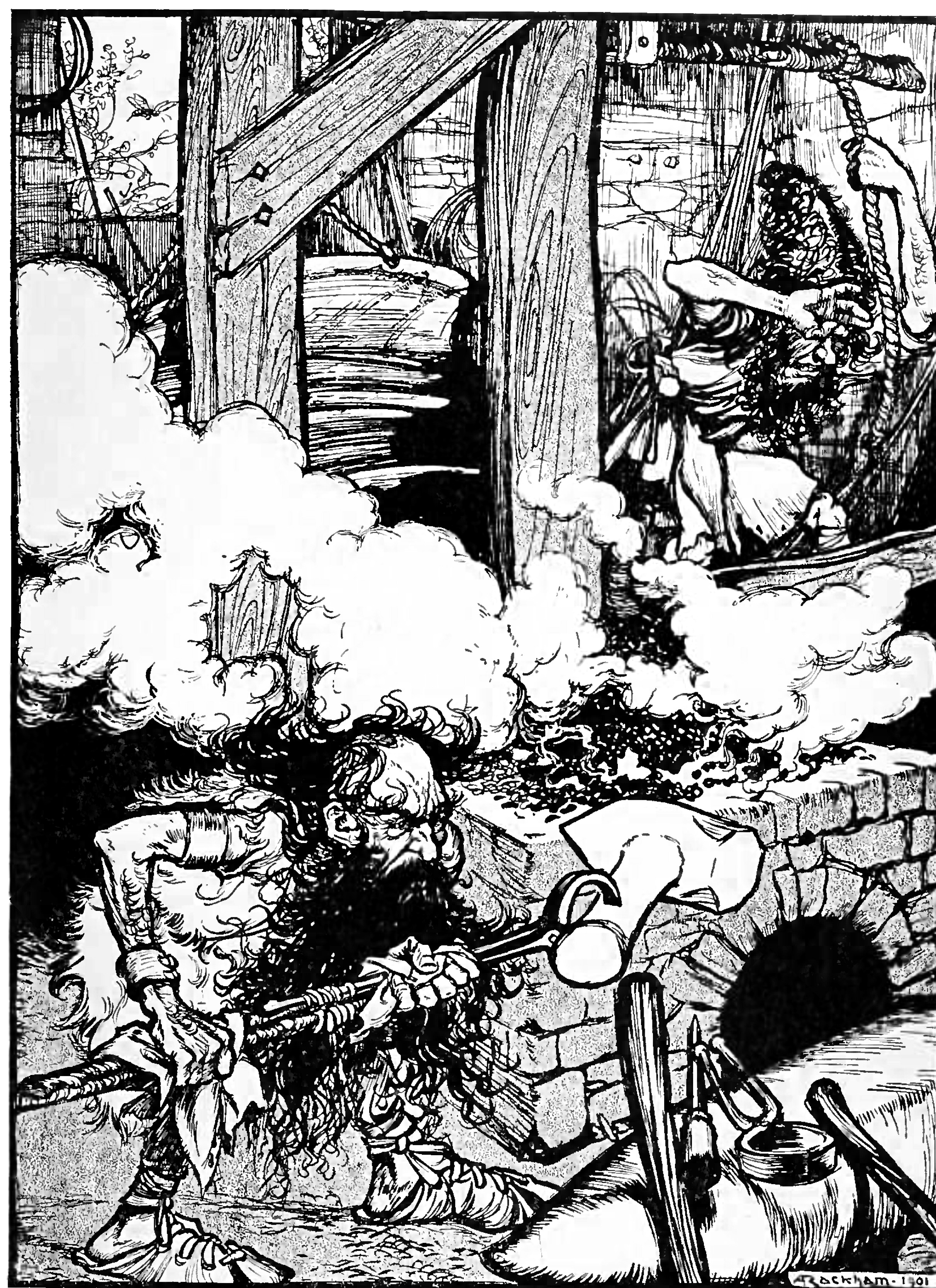
Brokkr (top right) works the bellows while Eitri (in the foreground) fashions Mjölnir; at top left, Loki enters in the form of a fly. Illustration by Arthur Rackham, 1907.

In the Old Norse religion, Eitri (Old Norse: [ˈɛitre]; or Sindri) is a dwarf and the brother of Brokkr.

According to Skáldskaparmál, when Loki had Sif's hair, Freyr's ship Skidbladnir and Odin's spear Gungnir fashioned by the Sons of Ivaldi, he bet his own head with Brokkr that Eitri would not have been able to make items that matched the craftsmanship of those mentioned above.

Eitri began working in his furnace while his brother was working the bellows, but a fly (sometimes thought to be Loki himself) began stinging Brokkr, trying to stop him and spoil the items.

Eitri succeeded in making the golden boar Gullinbursti, the golden ring Draupnir, and the hammer Mjöllnir that made his brother win the bet, even if its handle was shorter than it should have been.
