= Sindri (mythology) =

Norse mythical character

In Norse mythology, Sindri (Old Norse: [ˈsindre], from sindr, "slag") is the name of both a dwarf and a hall that will serve as a dwelling place for the souls of the virtuous after the events of Ragnarök. Sindri is also referred to as Eitri, the brother of Brokkr.

== A dwarf ==
Völuspá (37) mentions "a hall of gods, of the lineage of Sindri" located northward, in Niðavellir. There are several reasons to think that Sindri is a dwarf: his name is related with forging and the hall is made of gold (dwarves are said to be skillful smiths), the location of the hall is Niðavellir, which possibly means "dark fields" (dwarves live away from the sunlight).

In the Poetic Edda, Sindri's name is Eitri. The names of the dwarves are not given in the three other main manuscripts of the Prose Edda but in the Codex Regius, an unknown author added more recently the names of Brokkr and Sindri. Despite the difference in names, the story of the dwarf brothers and the creation of the gifts for the gods remain the same.

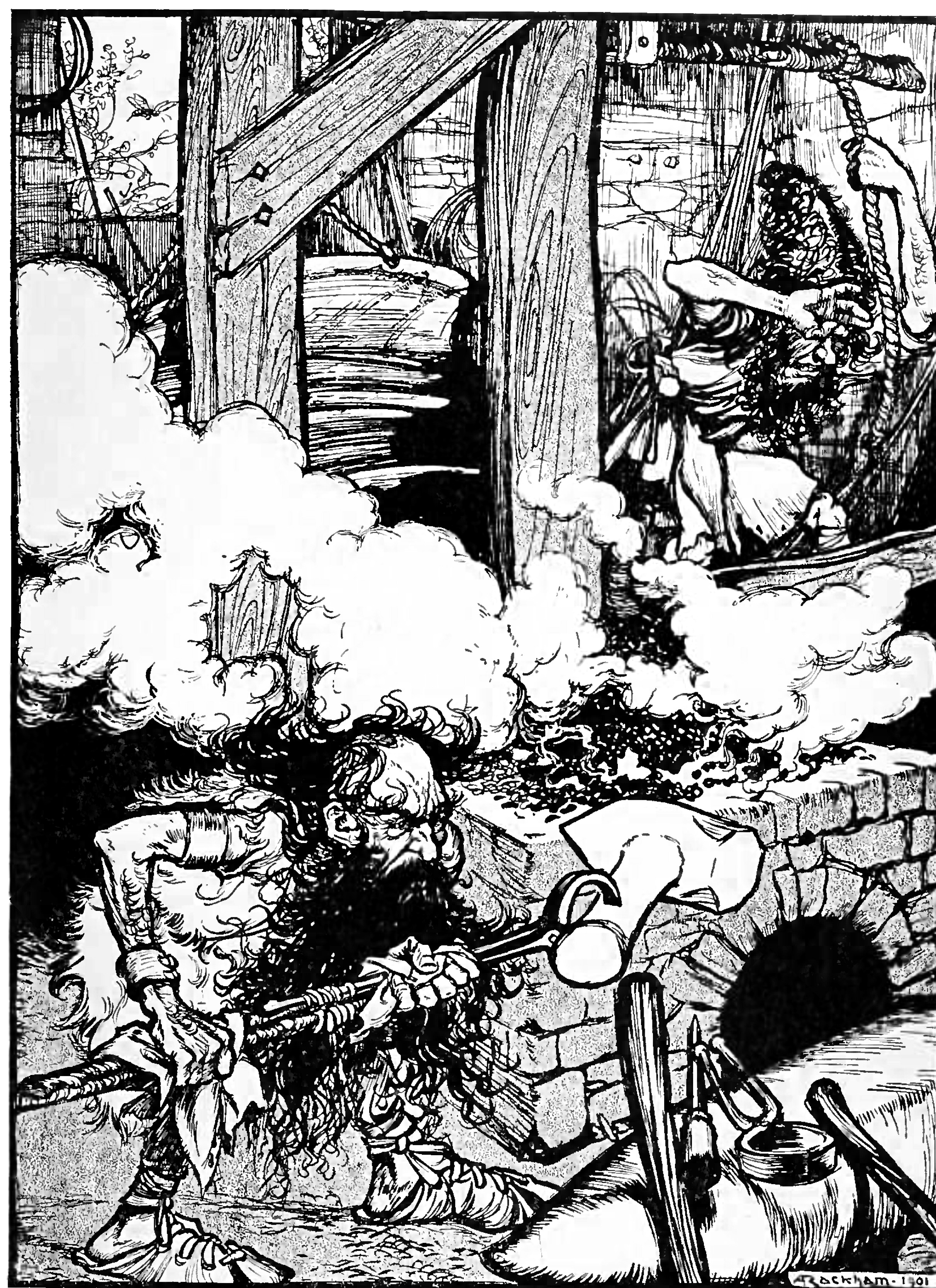
Brokkr (top right) and Sindri (center) creating Thor's hammer, Mjolnir as the fly, Loki, harasses them (top left)

In the Skáldskaparmál (Codex Wormianus version), Snorri Sturluson tells how the dwarves Brokkr and Sindri fashioned some of the magical objects used by the gods. The objects used by the gods were created after Loki cut Sif's hair. To avoid punishment, Loki pleaded with Thor to let him go down to Svartalfheim, to have the dwarves create a new, golden head of hair for Sif. After having the sons of Ivaldi create the golden hair for Sif, the spear of Odin, Gungnir, and a magic ship for Freyr, Skidbladnir, Loki bet Brokkr and Sindri that they couldn't create equally impressive items. Loki even bet his head that the brothers couldn't. Loki, being the trickster he is, turned into a fly and pestered the brothers as they were fashioning the gods' objects. Sindri placed gold into the fire and Loki bit Sindri on the hand. Sindri pulled Gullinbursti, the boar of Freyr, out of the fire. Sindri put another piece of gold into the fire as Brokkr operated the bellows. The fly bit Brokkr on the neck and Sindri pulled Draupnir, the ring of Odin, out of the fire. Sindri then put iron in the fire and the fly stung Brokkr in between the eyes, drawing blood and preventing Brokkr from seeing his work. Sindri pulled out Mjölnir, the hammer of Thor. Although mighty, the hammer’s handle was short due to the fly’s harassment. Loki made it to the gods before the dwarves and presented the gifts. However, the gods still decided that Loki owed the dwarves his head. The dwarves approached Loki, but he said he promised his head, not his neck. The brothers were content sewing Loki’s mouth shut and returned to their forge.

Sindri is also a dwarf in Þorsteins saga Víkingssonar. He helps Þorstein to defeat a powerful enemy (22–23) and to escape when he is taken prisoner (25). In this saga, he has a daughter named Herríð and a son named Herrauð (22).

== A hall ==
In Gylfaginning, Snorri refers to Sindri as the name of a golden hall that will serve as a dwelling place for the good and righteous after Ragnarök (along with Brimir and Gimlé):

That too is a good hall which stands in Nida Fells [Niðafjöll], made of red gold; its name is Sindri. In these halls shall dwell good men and pure in heart.

—Gylfaginning (LII), Brodeur's translation

For Rudolf Simek, this seems to be a transposition of the Christian belief in Heaven, despite the fact that Sindri is in Snorri's account located in Niðafjöll, the mountains from which the corpse-sucking dragon Níðhöggr comes according to Völuspá.

Some argue that Snorri's view of Sindri as a place rather than as a character may come from a misinterpretation of the stanza of Völuspá. In Norse Mythology: A Guide to Gods, Heroes, Rituals and Beliefs, John Lindow talks about how Sindri might be a golden hall, or it might be a hall related to a person named Sindri.

== Notes and references ==
=== References ===
- Acker, P., & Larrington, C. (2002). The Poetic Edda: Essays on Norse Mythology (p. 146). Taylor & Francis Group.
- Brodeur, Arthur Gilchrist (trans.). 1916. Snorri Sturluson: The Prose Edda. New York: The American-Scandinavian Foundation.
- Falk, Hjalmar & Torp, Alf: Etymologisk ordbog over det norske og det danske sprog (Oslo 1991). ISBN 82-90520-16-6.
- Faulkes, Anthony (ed.). 1998. Snorri Sturluson: Edda. Skáldskaparmál. Vol. 1, Introduction, Text and Notes. London: Viking Society for Northern Research. ISBN 0-903521-36-9.
- Larrington, Carolyne (trans.). 1999. The Poetic Edda. First published in 1996. Oxford: Oxford University Press. ISBN 0-19-283946-2.
- Lindow, John. 2002. Norse Mythology: A Guide to the Gods, Heroes, Rituals, and Beliefs. New York: Oxford University Press. First published in 2001 by ABC-Clio. ISBN 0-19-515382-0.
- McCoy, D. (2019). The Creation of Thor's Hammer. Norse Mythology for Smart People. Retrieved April 13, 2023, from https://norse-mythology.org/tales/loki-and-the-dwarves/.
- Norwegian names - http://www.norskenavn.no/navn.php?id=203
- Orchard, Andy. 2002. Cassell's dictionary of Norse myth & legend. London: Cassell. First published in 1997. ISBN 0-304-36385-5.
- Simek, Rudolf. 1996. Dictionary of Northern Mythology. Translated by Angela Hall. First published by Alfred Kröner Verlag in 1984. Cambridge: D. S. Brewer. ISBN 0-85991-513-1.
