= Loki's wager =

Idea that a concept is ill-defined, and therefore cannot be discussed

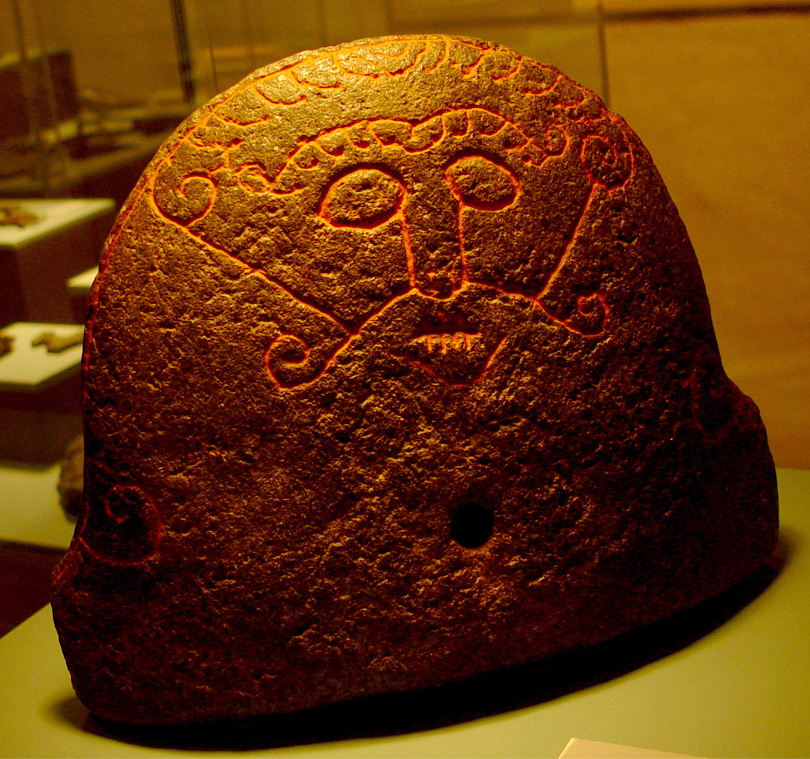
The Snaptun stone has been identified as Loki with his lips stitched shut after the wager

Loki's wager is the insistence that because two or more categories exist as poles on a spectrum with a grey area in the middle, the distinction between the two cannot be defined.

== The wager ==
In the Prose Edda (Skáldskaparmál ch. 35), the Norse trickster god Loki made a bet with the dwarf Brokkr in which he wagered his head. Loki lost; when the dwarf came to collect it, Loki stated that he would relinquish his head, but noted that Brokkr was not entitled to any part of Loki's neck. After a discussion on the matter, while parts of Loki clearly belonged to the head or the neck, neither side could agree exactly where one ended and the other began. Loki therefore kept his head indefinitely, though afterwards his lips were stitched shut by Brokkr as punishment for using tricky wordplay.

== In argumentation theory ==
Loki's wager, therefore, is a situation in which a person unreasonably insists that a term cannot be defined, making it impossible to discuss. It has been described as a fallacy and more precisely as a kind of continuum fallacy.

== See also ==
- Sorites paradox
- Ship of Theseus
- Draupnir – The gold ring at the center of the myth
- Equivocation
- Fuzzy concept
- Merchant of Venice – specifically how the 'pound of flesh' agreement was nullified
- Moving the goalposts
- Quibble (plot device) – The use of the fallacy as a plot device
- Vagueness
