= Gotland Runic Inscription 181 =

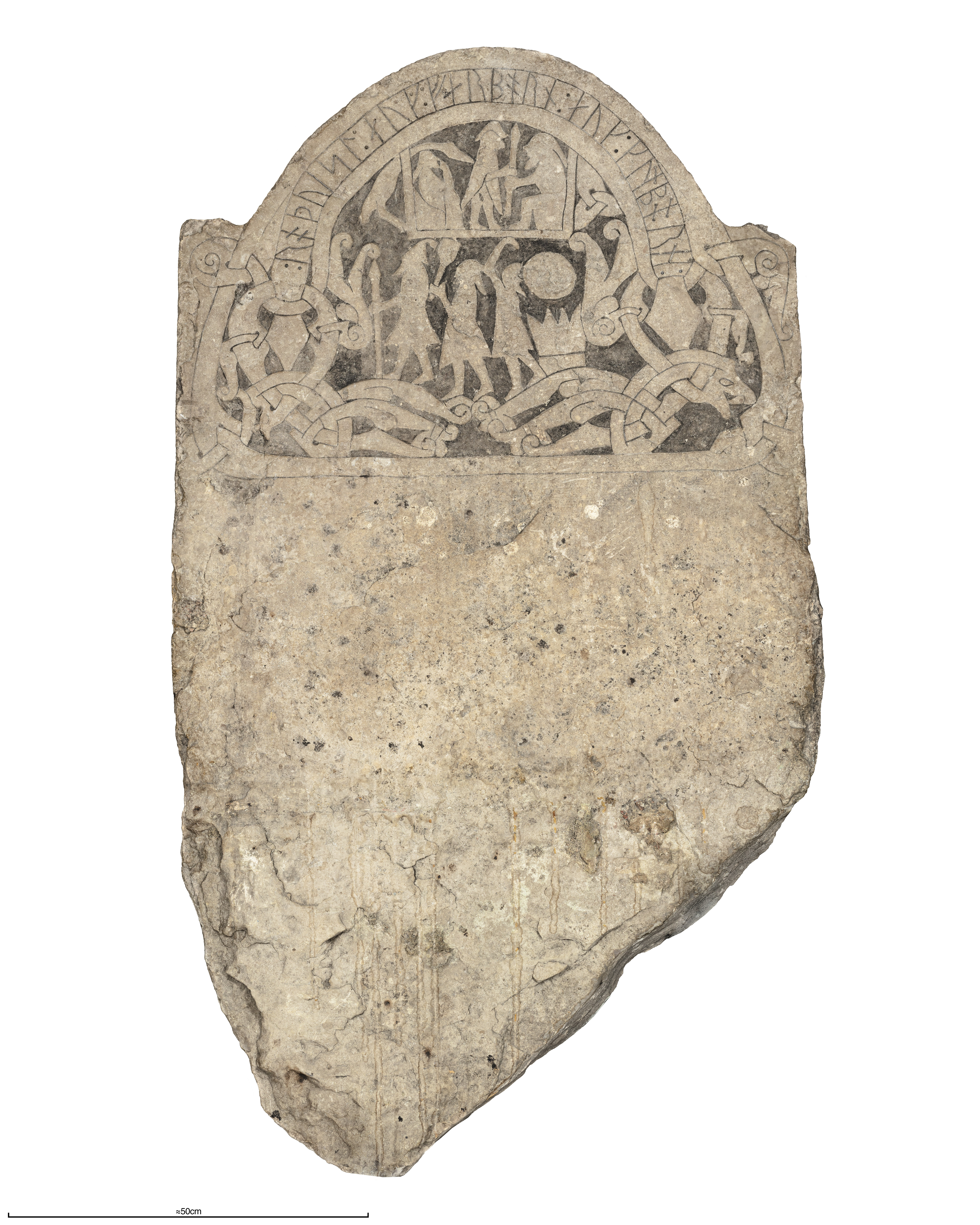
Runic Inscription 181

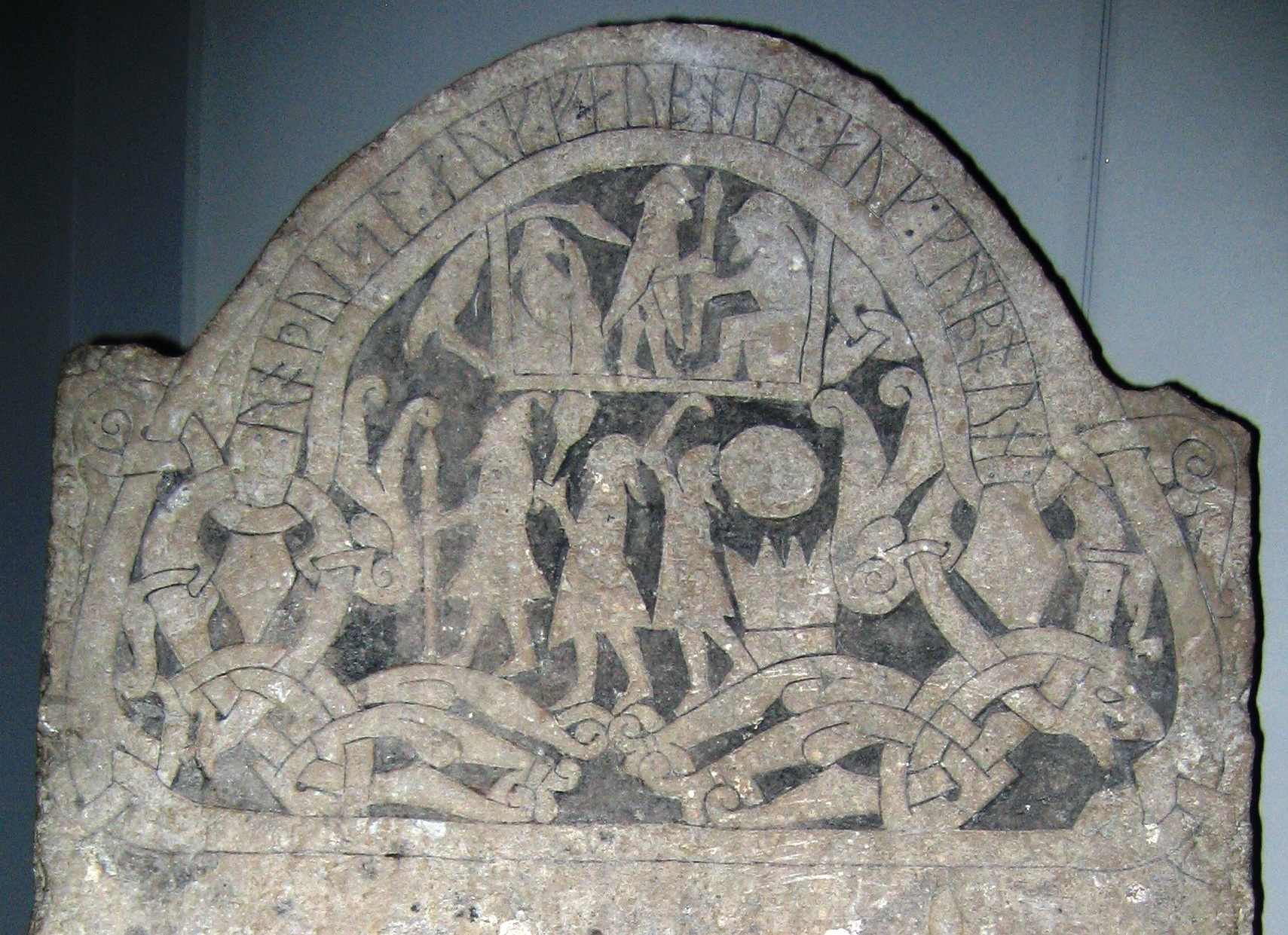
Runestone G 181 with figures identified as Odin, Thor, and Freyr.

This Viking Age runestone, designated as G 181 in the Rundata catalog, was originally located at a church at Sanda, Gotland, Sweden, and is believed to depict the three Norse pagan gods Odin, Thor, and Freyr.

== Description ==
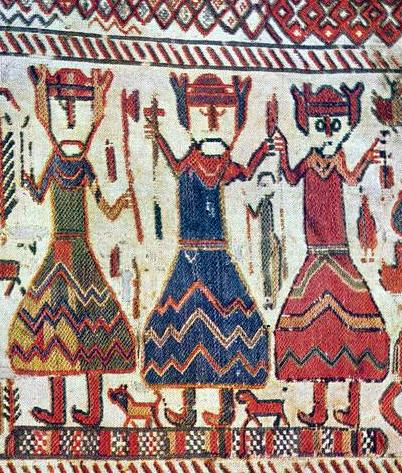
Cf. the 13th c. Skog tapestry, which has a similar triad and may depict the same three gods.

The runestone was discovered in the churchyard of Sanda church in 1863 and is currently located in the Swedish Museum of National Antiquities. It is classified as being carved in runestone style Pr2, also known as Ringerike style.

The inscription depicts two scenes under an arching runic text band. The lower panel contains three figures, holding a spear, a hammer or club, and a sickle. Because the weapon of Odin was the spear Gungnir, that of Thor the hammer Mjöllnir, and Freyr is identified with farming, the figures have been identified as these three gods. They are depicted wearing typical Viking Age clothing, including a cloak known as a hekla and a tasseled conical cap called a skott-húfa. The upper scene also has three figures, which are considered to be the same gods; a large bird that may be a crane or goose is shown bending its head over the figure identified as Freyr. Its meaning is not understood.

Some authorities have cited the runestone as evidence that Odin, Thor, and Freyr formed a divine Norse triad or trinity. The proposition of this divine triad comes from theories of comparative religion and descriptions and depictions of these gods. Other evidence for such a triad includes Adam of Bremen's description of the Temple at Uppsala as containing statues of these gods. These three are also the only Norse gods known to have been actively worshipped during the Viking Age.

The runic inscription is carved in the younger futhark and consists of three personal names. Björn (Old Norse Bjǫrn) was a common name meaning "bear"; Gunnbjǫrn translates as "Battle Bear" and Farbjǫrn may mean "Far Traveling Bear".

== Inscription ==
The second line is a transliteration of the runes; the third is transcription into Old Norse.

: ᚱᚬᚦᚢᛁᛋᛚ : ᛅᚢᚴ : ᚠᛅᚱᛒᚬᚱᚾ : ᛅᚢᚴ : ᚴᚢᚾᛒᚬᚱᚾ :
: roþuisl : aug : farborn : auk : kunborn :
{} Hróðvísl {} ok {} Farbjǫrn {} ok {} Gunnbjǫrn. {}
Hróðvisl and Farbjọrn and Gunnbjọrn.

== See also ==
- Triple deity
