= Dwarf (folklore) =

Supernatural being in Germanic folklore

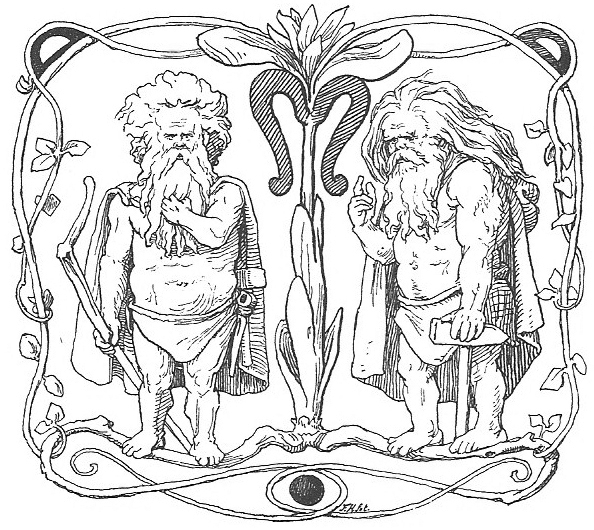
Two dwarves as depicted in a 19th-century edition of the Poetic Edda poem Völuspá (1895) by Lorenz Frølich

A dwarf (pl. dwarfs or dwarves) is a type of supernatural human-shaped being in Germanic folklore. Accounts of dwarfs vary significantly throughout history. They are commonly, but not exclusively, presented as living in mountains or stones and being skilled craftsmen. In early literary sources, only males are explicitly referred to as dwarfs. However, they are described as having sisters and daughters, while male and female dwarfs feature in later saga literature and folklore. Dwarfs are sometimes described as short; however, scholars have noted that this is neither explicit, nor relevant to their roles in the earliest sources.

Dwarfs continue to feature in modern popular culture, such as in the works of J. R. R. Tolkien and Terry Pratchett, where they are often, but not exclusively, presented as distinct from elves.

== Etymology and meaning ==
=== Etymology ===
The modern English noun dwarf descends from Old English: dweorg. It has a variety of cognates in other Germanic languages, including Old Norse dvergr, Old Frisian dwerch, Middle Dutch dwerch, Middle Low German dwerch, and Old High German twerg.

The common Proto-Germanic form is generally reconstructed as *dwergaz. A different etymology traces it to Proto-Germanic *dwezgaz, with the r sound being the product of Verner's Law. Linguist Anatoly Liberman connects the Germanic word with Modern English dizzy, suggesting a link between the etymology and their role in inflicting mental diseases on humans, similar to some other supernatural beings in Germanic folklore such as elves and alps.

Before the Proto-Germanic stage, the origin of the word dwarf is highly debated. Scholars in historical linguistics and comparative mythology have suggested that dwarfs may have started out as nature spirits, beings linked to death, disease, metallurgy, and the wilderness, or a blend of other different concepts. Some theories trace the word to the Proto-Indo-European root *dʰeur- ('damage'), or to *dʰreugʰ (whence modern English 'dream' and German Trug 'deception'). Scholars have also compared it to the Sanskrit dhvaras, a type of 'demonic being'. Alternatively, linguist Guus Kroonen has suggested that it may derive from a verb *dwerganan ('to squeeze, press'), which might be attested in Middle High German zwergen.

=== English meaning ===
In Old English, the use of dweorg ('dwarf') to designate a mythological being is not conclusively attested, though it is assumed to have existed based on references to an illness attributed to a supernatural being. A related Old English plant name, dweorge-dwostle (pennyroyal), might also suggest a belief in a dwarf-related malady or a connection with warding off the being responsible. Additionally, early place names such as Dueridene (now Dwarriden), Dwerihouse (now Dwerryhouse), and Dwerffehole further hint at the presence of a supernatural concept of dwarves, often associated with subterranean spaces.

Modern English has two plurals for the word dwarf: dwarfs and dwarves. The former remains the most commonly employed plural, although the minority plural dwarves was recorded as early as 1818. However, it was later popularized by the fiction of philologist and legendarium author J. R. R. Tolkien, originating as a hypercorrective mistake. It was employed by Tolkien for some time before 1917. Regarding his use of this plural, Tolkien wrote in 1937, "I am afraid it is just a piece of private bad grammar, rather shocking in a philologist; but I shall have to go with it." He notes, however, that the regular continuation of the Old English plural dweorgas would have begotten "dwarrows," and the oblique stem dweorge- would likewise have produced "dwarry," "dwerry" or "dwery." Reflexes of the oblique do indeed appear frequently as prefixes in English toponymy, but "dwarrow" only occurs in Tolkien's English calque of the Khuzdul name of Moria.

== Attestations ==
=== Eddic sources ===
==== Terminology ====
Scholars have noted that the Svartálfar ('black elves') appear to be the same beings as dwarfs, given that both are described in the Prose Edda as the residents of Svartálfheimr. Another potential synonym is dökkálfar ('dark elves'); however, it is unclear whether svartálfar and dökkálfar were considered the same at the time of the writing of the Prose Edda. It is not known whether the Norse folk generally believed in svartálfar, as they are only ever attested in the Prose Edda. The partial overlap of dwarfs in Eddic sources with elves is supported by the names of dwarfs recorded in the Dvergatal section of Völuspá, which include Álfr ('Elf'), Gandálfr ('Wand-elf' or 'Magic-staff-elf'), and Vindálfr ('Wind-elf'). Dvergatal further lists Yngvi – a name of the god Freyr who was given Álfheimr, the home of the elves, to rule according to Grímnismál.

==== Notable Eddic dwarfs ====
- Andvari, a shapechanging dwarf featuring in the Völsung cycle who is extorted out of his treasure by Loki.
- Fjalarr and Galarr, two brothers who murder Kvasir and brew the mead of poetry from his blood.
- Brokkr and Sindri, brothers who craft Draupnir, Gullinbursti and Mjölnir for the gods.
- Sons of Ívaldi, brothers who craft Gungnir, Skíðblaðnir and Sif's hair for the gods.
- Alvíss, a dwarf who requested the hand in marriage of Þórr's daughter Þrúðr. Þórr outwits him by keeping him talking until daybreak, whereupon he turns to stone
- Litr, a dwarf kicked by Þórr into Baldr's funeral pyre for an unclear reason, possibly spite.

=== Germanic heroic legend and sagas ===
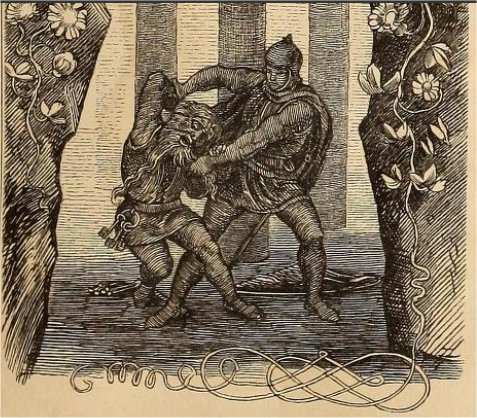
Siegfried wrestling Alberich, by Julius Schnorr von Carolsfeld

==== Continuity with older beliefs ====
After the Christianisation of the Germanic peoples, dwarfs continued in the folklore of Germanic-speaking areas of Europe and the literary works produced there. Opinions on the degree of continuity in beliefs on dwarfs before and after Christianisation differ significantly. Some scholars, such as Rudolf Simek, propose that the folk beliefs remained essentially intact in the transitional period, making later sources exceedingly informative on pre-Christian Germanic religion. In contrast, others, such as Schäfke, argue that there is no resemblance between Eddic and skaldic dwarfs and those in later sources.

==== Old Norse ====
Dwarfs feature throughout both fornaldarsögur and riddarasögur. In Völsunga saga, which details the events that unfold after Loki extorts treasure out of the dwarf Andvari, to pay the wergild for his killing of Ótr, a being whose brother Regin is also described in some sources as either resembling or being a dwarf. In Hervarar saga ok Heiðreks, the sword Tyrfing is forged, and subsequently cursed, by a dwarf named Dvalinn, and another named Dulin in the Hauksbók manuscript.

==== Middle High German ====
In German literature, many dwarfs can make themselves invisible, typically via a "Tarnkappe" (cloak of invisibility), which has been suggested to be an ancient attribute of dwarfs. Depending on the story, they may be hostile or friendly to humans.

The dwarf Alberich plays a vital role in the Nibelungenlied, where he guards the Nibelung's treasure and has the strength of twelve men. He is defeated by Siegfried and afterwards serves the hero. In Ortnit, Alberich seduces the Lombardy queen, spawning the hero Ortnit. The dwarf then aids Ortnit in his adventures after revealing to the hero that he is his father. In Das Lied vom Hürnen Seyfrid, Siegfried is aided by the dwarf Eugel, who is the son of the dwarf king Nibelung, originator of the Nibelung's treasure.

The hero Dietrich von Bern is portrayed in adventures involving dwarfs. In Laurin, he fights against the dwarf King Laurin at the dwarf's magical rose garden. He later rescues a woman whom Laurin had kidnapped. A similar plot occurs in the fragmentary poem Goldemar. In Virginal, Dietrich rescues the dwarf queen Virginal from a force of invading heathens. The dwarfs Eggerich and Baldung play a role in aiding Dietrich in the poem Sigenot: Baldung gives Dietrich a magical gem that prevents him from being bitten when thrown into a snake pit, whereas Eggerich helps Dietrich and Hildebrand escape. In the Heldenbuch-Prosa, a dwarf takes Dietrich out of this world after the death of all the other heroes, a role given to Laurin in some different versions of Dietrich's end.

=== Modern period ===
Dwarfs feature in the modern folklore of Germanic-speaking regions of Europe, such as the Simonside Dwarfs in Northumberland, who are sometimes believed to use lights to lure people off paths, akin to a will-o'-the-wisp.

Some dwarfs in modern folklore have been argued to belong to a broader group of smith-beings living within hollow mountains or in caves such as the Grinkenschmied. These craftsmen can be referred to explicitly as dwarfs or terms that describe their roles such as Swedish: bergsmed ('mountain smith'). Mounds in Denmark can also be referred to by names derived from their inhabitants, such as 'smedsberg' or 'smedshoie' ('smith's hill' or 'smith's mound'). Anglian folklore tells that one can hear a forge from within a mound and feel furnace fires under the earth, while in Switzerland, the heat can be attributed to the underground kitchens of dwarfs. In one example, the furnace's heat is believed to increase soil fertility.

== Attributes and themes ==
=== Diversity and vagueness ===
Rather than existing a "true" single nature of a dwarf, they vary in their characteristics, not only across regions and time but also between one another in the same cultural context. Some are capable of changing their form entirely. The scholar Ármann Jakobsson notes that accounts of dwarfs in the Eddas and the section of Ynglinga saga regarding Sveigðir lack prominence in their narratives and cohesive identity. Based on this, he puts forward the idea that dwarfs in these sources are set apart from other beings by their difficulty to be defined and generalised, ultimately stemming from their intrinsic nature to be hidden and as the "Other" that stands in contrast with humans.

=== Appearance ===
==== Form and colour ====
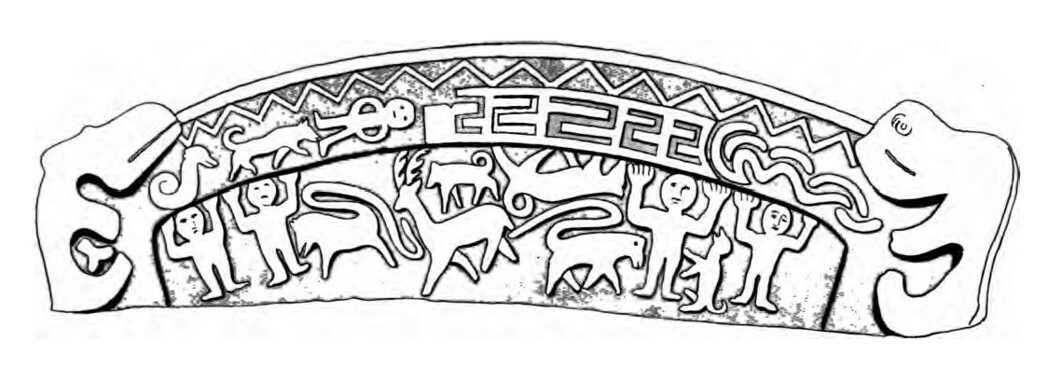
Face of the Heysham hogback stone depicting four figures with upraised arms, which have been interpreted as the dwarfs Norðri, Suðri, Austri and Vestri holding up the sky

Based on the etymology of dwarf, it has been proposed that the oldest conception of a dwarf was as exclusively a formless spirit, potentially as in the case of disease-causing dwarfs; however, this view is not seen in the oldest manuscript accounts. In the quotation of Völuspá in the Prose Edda, the dwarfs emerge as beings with human form (mannlíkun), while in the Codex Regius manuscript the first two dwarfs created either dwarfs or people with human forms. The prose of the Ynglinga saga describes a dwarf sitting, standing, and speaking, leading to the proposal that at the time of writing, dwarfs were believed to, at least sometimes, have a human-like form. It nonetheless appears to have been recognised as a dwarf; however, that may have been due to its behaviour instead of its physical appearance. In skaldic and Eddic sources, it has been noted that their roles are what define them rather than their physical appearance, which has no significant relevance.

Many dwarf names in Eddic sources relate to light and brightness, such as Dellingr ('the gleaming one') and Glóinn ('glowing'). Stories do not explain these names, but it has been theorised that they refer to the fires in the forges the dwarfs work, or to haugaeldar ('grave mound fires') that are found in later Icelandic folklore. In contrast, Snorri describes dökkálfar (which are typically identified as dwarfs) as "blacker than pitch". Alvíss is described by Thor in Alvíssmál as being as unsuitable for wedding his daughter Þrúðr as he was "pale about the nostrils" and resembled a þurs.

In Middle High German heroic poetry, most dwarfs have long beards, but some may appear childish.

==== Size ====
In the early Old Norse sources, dwarfs are typically described vaguely, with no reference to them being particularly small; in the legendary sagas and later folklore, however, they are often described as short.

Norðri, Suðri, Austri and Vestri are four dwarfs, potentially depicted as four anthropomorphic figures on the hogback stone in Heysham in Lancashire, that according to the Prose Edda, each holds up a corner of the sky, that was fashioned from the skull of Ymir. It has been suggested that this would imply that dwarfs could be very tall, acting like the titan Atlas; however, it has been noted that the sky could have been conceived of as being close to the earth at the horizon. Regin, a figure identified as either a dwarf or resembling a dwarf, is a similar size to the hero Sigurd on both the Ramsund carving and carvings from the Hylestad Stave Church. Dwarf names in Eddic sources include Fullangr ('tall enough') and Hár ('high'); however, the terms are ambiguous and do not necessarily mean the dwarfs were conceived of as tall relative to a human. Some names suggest a small size, such as Nori and Nabbi, which have been translated as "tiny" and "little nub", respectively; however, it has been argued that this was not necessarily the general rule.

Not all late sagas involving dwarfs describe their size, but all that do describe them as short. In some German stories, the dwarf takes on the attributes of a knight but is most clearly separated from normal humans by his small size, in some cases only reaching up to the knees. Despite their small size, dwarfs in these contexts typically have superhuman strength, either by nature or through magical means. Anatoly Liberman suggests that dwarfs may have been initially thought of as lesser supernatural beings, which became literal smallness after Christianisation.

==== Shape changing ====
Diversity in appearance is not only seen between dwarfs throughout time and region but also with individual dwarfs, who can be capable of changing their shape and size, such as in Reginsmál, in which the dwarf Andvari lived as a pike in the water due to curse from a Norn, however, could also take on a human-like shape. In later German folklore, the Zwergkönig ('Dwarf King') is a tiny being but is capable of becoming enormously tall at will.

=== Gender and family groups ===
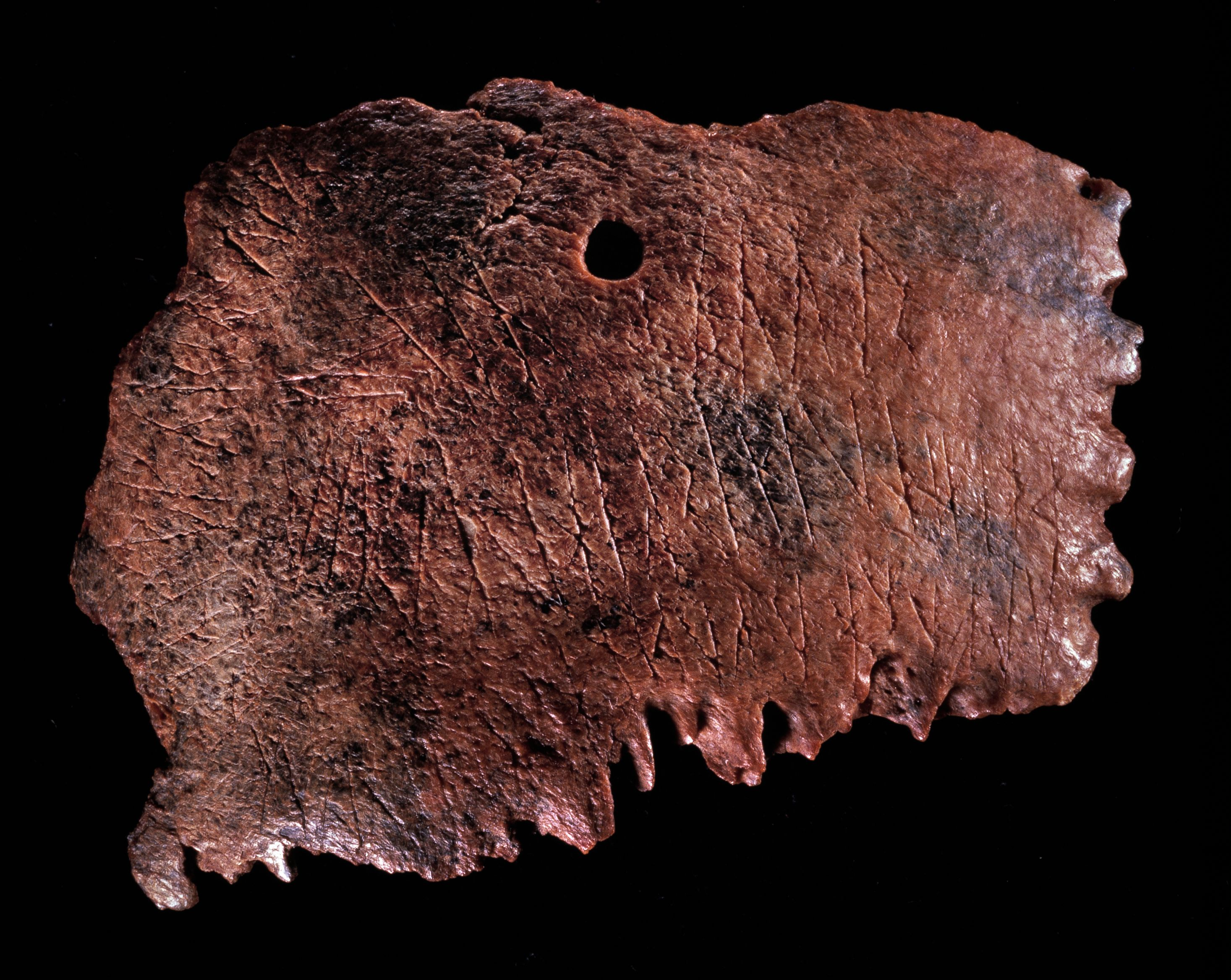
The Ribe skull fragment, dating to the 8th century CE, bearing a protective charm against either one or two dwarfs

In Eddic and skaldic sources, dwarfs are almost exclusively male; for example, in the Dvergatal, every dwarf named is male. Some scholars have proposed that female dwarfs were not believed to exist; however, they are likely attested in charms dating to the early medieval period and are explicitly described in later saga material, and German and Nordic folk beliefs. Dwarfs are also widely referenced in these sources as having family relations with others, such as brothers and sons, implying motherhood, and not merely emerging from the earth. Pairs or groups of brothers are seen relatively abundantly in Eddic contexts, as with the sons of Ívaldi, and Fjalarr and Galarr.

The inscription on the 8th century Ribe skull fragment has been interpreted by some scholars as explicitly referring to a dvergynja ('female-dwarf') that may have been believed to have been causing harm to the user of the fragment. This interpretation is paralleled in Wið Dweorh XCIIIb (Against a Dwarf XCIIIb), in which a harmful dwarf's sister is called to prevent him from causing an afflicted person's illness.

In Fáfnismál, the ormr (Old Norse "worm" or "serpent") Fáfnir refers to the Norns that weave fate for the dwarfs as "Dvalinn's daughters" (Old Norse: Dvalins dǿtr), while in the Prose Edda, they are described as "of the dwarfs' kin" (Old Norse: dverga ættar). (Note: It is unclear whether "Dvalinn's daughters" means that they are literally the daughters of the dwarf Dvalinn, or that the term refers more generally to descendants of dwarfs.) As Norns are also female, this could mean that dwarfs were conceived of by the author of the poem as able to be female; it is not clear whether either the Norns' mother (or mothers) were dwarfs, or if they themselves were considered dwarfs because of their descent.

It has been noted that it may not be that female dwarfs did not exist in the folklore of this period, only that no explicit references to them survive in preserved narratives. It has been proposed this may be because narratives typically centre on the gods rather than dwarfs and that female dwarfs were not conceived of as of great relevance to the gods, given their primary interest in obtaining goods from dwarfs (which does not depend on their gender). Humans, being of lower power and status, cannot control dwarfs as easily and require alternative strategies to obtain treasures from them, potentially explaining why female dwarfs are more prominent in saga literature.

Female dwarfs feature in the late Gibbons saga, Bósa saga and Þjalar-Jóns saga, where they are referred to by the term "dyrgja". In these cases, female dwarfs are only mentioned alongside males and are not independently important to the plot. Beyond Svama, the named dyrgja in Þjalar-Jóns saga, the only other explicitly named dwarf woman in saga literature is the daughter of Sindri in Þorsteins saga Víkingssonar, Herríðr. In saga material, dwarf children are also seen. In Þorsteins saga Víkingssonar and Egils saga einhenda ok Ásmundar berserkjabana, central characters help these children and are rewarded in return by the father with treasures. Conversely, in Sigurðar saga þǫgla, the human Hálfdan is cursed after he throws a rock at a dwarf child, breaking its jaw, and is subsequently visited by the child's father in a dream who curses him. Hálfdan's brother later gives the child a gold ring to atone for the harm and is rewarded by the father, once more in a dream. Together, this suggests that dwarfs could be conceived of as loving and protective of their children by the saga authors. In Þorsteins saga Víkingssonar, this family love is extended to the human Hálfdan who develops a fostering relation with the dwarf Litr, likely with Hálfdan as the foster son.

In German heroic legend, male dwarfs are often portrayed as lusting after human women; likewise, female dwarfs seek to possess the male hero.

=== Craftsmanship and treasure ===
In Eddic sources dwarfs are attributed with creating magical treasures for the gods such as Mjölnir, Sif's hair, Draupnir, Gullinbursti, Skíðblaðnir, Gleipnir and Gungnir, while in Sörla þáttr they craft Brísingamen for Freyja. They further created the Mead of Poetry from the blood of Kvasir, which grants skill in poetry to those who drink from it. According to Skáldskaparmál, due to the role of dwarfs in crafting the drink, poetry can be referred to by kennings such as "the Billow of the Dwarf-Crag", "Thought's Drink of the Rock-Folk", "the Drink of Dvalinn", "the Dwarves' ship" and the "Ale of the Dwarves". John Lindow noted that stanza 10 of the Poetic Edda poem Völuspá can be read as describing the creation of human forms from the earth and follows a catalogue of dwarf names; he suggests that the poem may present Ask and Embla as having been created by dwarfs, with the three gods then giving them life.

In Eddic and some saga sources, rather than being exchanged, items of value move from dwarfs to others, often through extortion. This has been suggested to be a critical differentiator between dwarfs and elves in pre-Christian Germanic religion, who maintain reciprocal and positive relationships with gods and humans; Kormaks saga describes how food was to be shared with elves to heal sickness and Austrfararvísur records an álfablót being held around the early 11th century in Sweden. Dwarfs, on the other hand, according to these sources, are asocial, and there are no records of them receiving blóts or other gifts in this period.

Dwarfs maintain their roles as reluctant donors of their possessions in some later Old Norse legends such as Volsunga saga and Hervarar saga ok Heiðreks, where they are forced to give up Andvaranaut and Tyrfing respectively. Some legendary and romance sagas diverge from this, with dwarfs acting friendly and helpfully; however, this is attributed to their lateness and likely do not represent perceptions that predate Christianisation. Typically, in these later sagas, fighting dwarfs is considered dishonourable, in contrast to other beings such as dragons. Receiving help from a dwarf, however, such as being healed or given a treasure, was not seen as problematic; it has been proposed that the worldview of the saga writers was that a hero is not defined by achieving deeds alone but by being able to both give and accept help.

In German legends, they also possess other magical objects and often appear as master smiths.

=== Association with mountains and stones ===
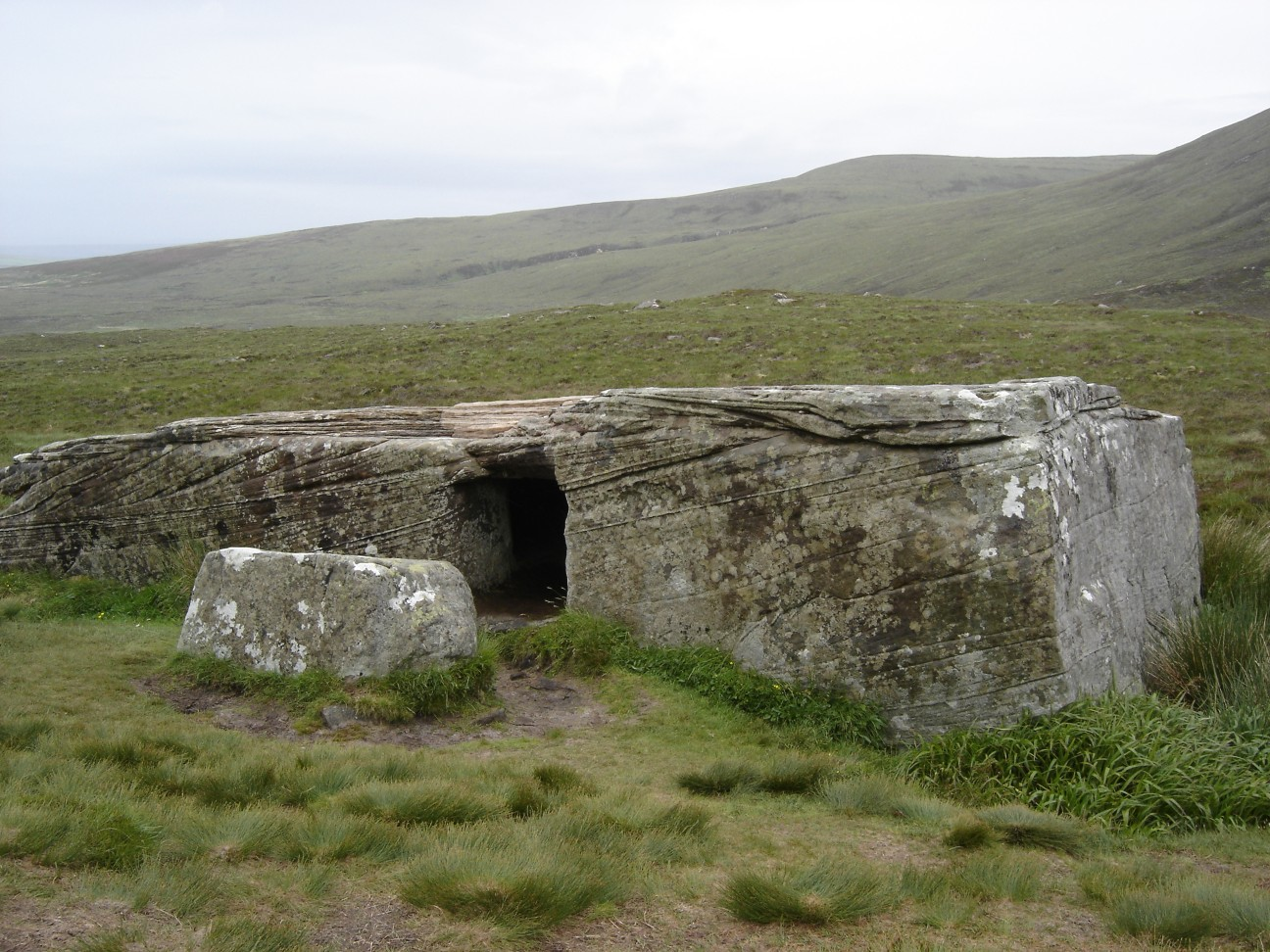
The Dwarfie Stane, on the island of Hoy, in Orkney

The Codex Regius version of Völuspá records that dwarfs were produced out of the earth, while in the Prose Edda, they form like maggots in the flesh of Ymir, which became the earth. Beyond this, in early Old Norse sources, there is ambiguity between whether dwarfs live within stones or whether they are themselves stones. In Völuspá they are referred to as 'masters of the rocks' (Old Norse: veggbergs vísir) and skaldic kennings for 'stone' include 'dvergrann' ('house of the dwarf') and 'Durnis niðja salr' ('the hall of Durnir's kinsman'). In Ynglingatal stanza 2 and the accompanying prose in the Ynglinga saga, a dwarf lures King Sveigðir into an open stone which closes behind them, whereupon he is never seen again. Ynglingasaga also describes this dwarf as being afraid of the sun (Old Norse: dagskjarr), akin to in Alvíssmál, where the poem's eponymous dwarf is turned to stone by sunlight.

In German legends, they typically live inside of hollow mountains; in some cases, they may live above the ground, while in saga literature, such as Þorsteins saga Víkingssonar they commonly live in individual stones, which could also serve as workshops, such as in the forging of Brísingamen in Sörla þáttr. The presentation of dwarfs living within stones continued into modern folklore surrounding specific landscape features such as the Dwarfie Stane, a chambered tomb located on the island of Hoy, and the Dvergasteinn in Seyðisfjörður.

It has been proposed by Lotte Motz that the inhabitation of mountains, stones, and mounds by dwarfs may be derived from their earlier association with the dead who were frequently buried in mounds and around megaliths.

=== Causing disease ===
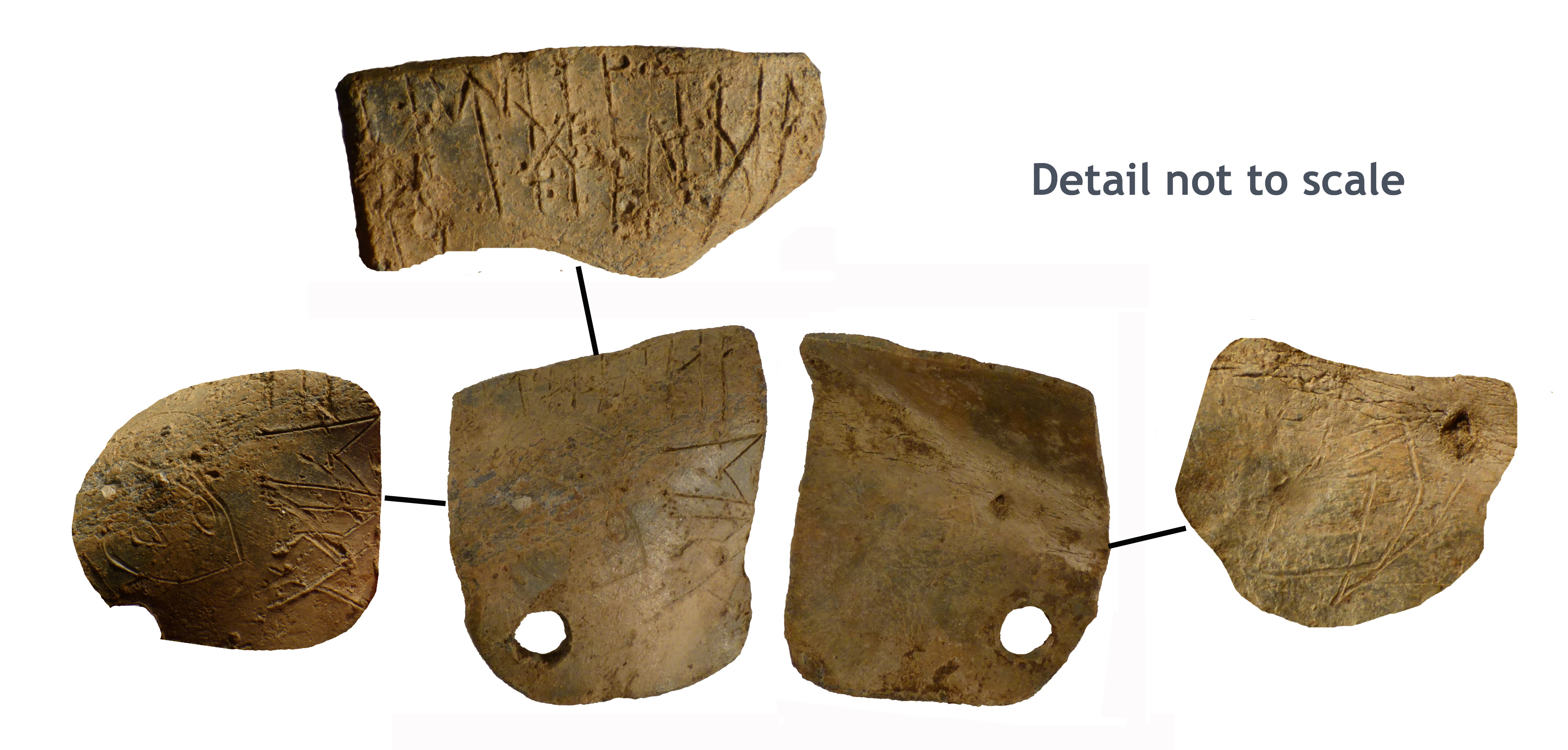
Lead plaque found near Fakenham, in Norfolk, believed to be a charm against a dwarf

The term 'dweorg' can be used in Old English texts to describe an illness; it is commonly used in medical texts derived from Greek or Latin sources, where it is used to gloss symptoms such as fever. The "Dictionary of Old English" divides the definition of Old English: dweorg into either "a dwarf or pygmy" or "a fever"; however, it has been argued that the distinction between the two meanings may not have been prevalent among Germanic peoples in the Early Middle Ages, due to the close association between the beings and sickness in medicinal charms.

The 8th century Ribe skull fragment, found in Jutland, bears an inscription that calls for help from three beings, including Odin, against either one or two harmful dwarfs. The item's function has been compared to the Sigtuna amulet I and Canterbury charm that seek to drive away a "lord of þursar" that is causing an infection, the latter explicitly with the help of Thor. A similar inscription dating between the 8th and 11th century is found on a lead plaque discovered near Fakenham in Norfolk, which reads "dead is dwarf" (Old English: dead is dwerg), and has been interpreted as another example of a written charm aiming to rid the ill person of the disease, identified as a dwarf. The Lacnunga contains the Anglo-Saxon charm Wið Dweorh XCIIIb (Against a Dwarf XCIIIb) that refers to a sickness as a dweorg that is riding the afflicted person like a horse, similar to the harmful mare in the later folklore of the Germanic-speaking peoples. Despite the Christian elements in the Wið Dweorh charms, such as the saints called upon for help, their foundations likely lie in a shared North-Sea Germanic tradition that includes inscribed runic charms such as those found in Ribe and Norfolk.

The conception of diseases as being caused by projectiles from supernatural beings is widespread in Germanic folklore through time, such as in the phenomenon of elfshot, in Wið færstice, where they are thrown by elves, Ēse and witches, and in the Canterbury charm in which an infection is caused by the 'wound-spear' (Old Norse: sár-þvara) used by the "lord of þursar". In the case of dwarfs, this association has continued in places into the modern period, such as in the Norwegian words dvergskot or dvergskott which refer to an 'animal disease' and translate literally as 'dwarfshot'.

== Toponymy ==
Placenames derived from dwarf or cognate:

England

- Dwarriden (Dwarf dale) – Valley in the West Riding of Yorkshire

== Influence on popular culture ==
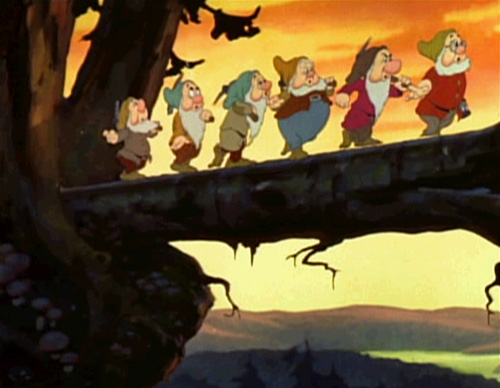
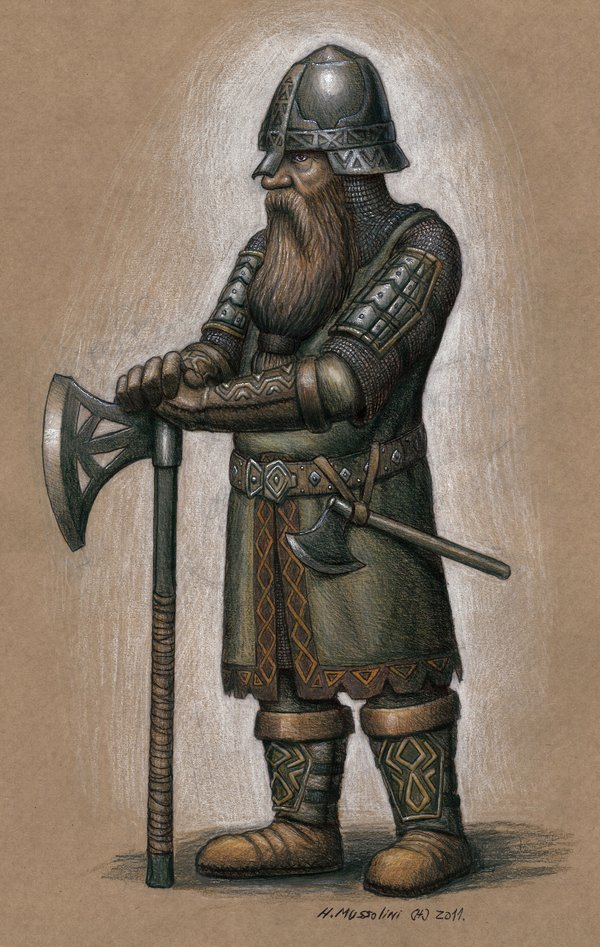
Left: The Seven Disney Dwarfs in the trailer for Snow White and the Seven Dwarfs. Right: an archetypal fantasy dwarf, based on the Dwarves from Tolkien's legendarium.

Dwarfs feature in modern tellings of folklore such as Walt Disney's film Snow White and the Seven Dwarfs (1937) based on the "Snow White" folktale retold by the Brothers Grimm.

Most dwarfs in modern fantasy fiction closely follow those of J. R. R. Tolkien's The Hobbit and The Lord of the Rings, where the dwarves (Tolkien's spelling) were distinguished from elves: most modern fantasy has continued this distinction. Dwarfs are also present in other fantasy literature such as C. S. Lewis's Narnia stories, Terry Pratchett's Discworld and the Artemis Fowl novels by Eoin Colfer.

The emergence of fantasy video games has led to differing depictions and interpretations of dwarfs. In the universe of The Elder Scrolls, "dwarves" (or Dwemer) are presented as a race of subterranean elves whose culture was centred around science and engineering, which differs from Tolkien's conceptualisation in that they are not particularly short, and are extinct. Other games like Dragon Age and Warcraft present an image of dwarfs as stout, bearded mountain dwellers, separate from Elves.

== See also ==
- Little people (mythology)
- Gnome
- Krasnoludek
- Oread
- Wight
- Elf
- Smithing gods
- Svartálfar
- Dökkálfar and Ljósálfar
- Jötunn
- Troll
- Egbere
- Bergsrå
- Duende
- Dwarves in Middle-earth
- Yaksha

== Bibliography ==
=== Primary ===
- Bellows, Henry Adam (2004). The poetic Edda : the mythological poems. Mineola, NY: Dover Publications. ISBN 9780486437101.
- Brodeur, Arthur Gilchrist (1916). Skáldskaparmal.
- Crawford, Jackson (2021). Two sagas of mythical heroes : Hervor and Heidrek & Hrólf Kraki and his champions. Indianapolis, Indiana: Hackett Publishing Company, Inc. ISBN 9781624669941.
- Morris, William; Eirikr, Magnusson. Volsung Saga – Völsunga Saga.
- Orchard, Andy (2011). The Elder Edda : a book of Viking lore. London: Penguin Books. ISBN 9780141393728.

=== Secondary ===
- Barreiro, Santiago Francisco (2014). "Religion, Alfar and Dvergar". Grupo de Estudos Celtas e Germânicos. 14 (1). ISSN 1519-9053.
- Gilliver, Peter; Marshall, Jeremy; Weiner, Edmund (2009). The Ring of Words: Tolkien and the Oxford English Dictionary. Oxford: Oxford University Press. ISBN 9780199568369.
- Grimm, Jacob; Grimm, Wilhelm (2014). The Original Folk and Fairy Tales of the Brothers Grimm: The Complete First ... Princeton University Press. ISBN 9781400851898.
- Hall, Alaric (2009). ""Þur sarriþu þursa trutin": Monster-Fighting and Medicine in Early Medieval Scandinavia". Asclepio. 61 (1): 195–218. doi:10.3989/asclepio.2009.v61.i1.278. PMID 19753693.
- Hines, John (2019). "Anglo-Saxon Micro-Texts - Practical Runic Literacy in the Late Anglo-Saxon Period: Inscriptions on Lead Sheet". Anglia Book Series. 63 (1): 29–59. doi:10.1515/9783110630961-003. S2CID 165389048.
- Jakobsson, Ármann (2005). "The Hole: Problems in Medieval Dwarfology". Arv - Nordic Yearbook of Folklore. 61: 53–76.
- Johnson, William G.; Houtman, Marcia K. (1986). "Platonic Shadows in C. S. Lewis' Narnia "Chronicles"". Modern Fiction Studies. 32 (1): 75–87. ISSN 0026-7724. JSTOR 26281851.
- Kroonen, Guus (2013). Etymological Dictionary of Proto-Germanic. Brill. ISBN 9789004183407.
- Liberman, Anatoly (2002). "A certain text" : close readings and textual studies on Shakespeare and others in honor of Thomas Clayton - A Cobweb of Dwarves and Dweebs. Newark: University of Delaware Press. pp. 173–192. ISBN 0874137896.
- Liberman, Anatoly (2008). An analytic dictionary of English etymology : an introduction. Minneapolis: University of Minnesota Press. ISBN 9780816652723.
- Liberman, Anatoly (2016). In prayer and laughter : essays on medieval Scandinavian and Germanic mythology, literature, and culture. Moscow. ISBN 9785895260272.
- Lütjens, August (1911). Der Zwerg in der deutschen Heldendichtung des Mittelalters. Breslau: M. & H. Marcus.
- Lindow, John (2001). Norse mythology : a guide to the Gods, heroes, rituals, and beliefs. Oxford: Oxford University Press. ISBN 9780195153828.
- Egeler, Matthias (2016). "Icelandic Folklore, Landscape Theory, and Levity: The Seyðisfjörður Dwarf-Stone". RMN Newsletter. 12/13: 8–18. ISSN 1799-4497.
- Mikučionis, Ugnius (2014). "The Family Life of the Dwarfs and its Significance for Relationships between Dwarfs and Humans in the Sagas". Maal og Minne. 106 (2): 155–191. ISSN 1890-5455.
- Mikučionis, Ugnius (2017). "Recognizing a dvergr: Physical Status and External Appearance of dvergar in Medieval Nordic Sources (8th-13th century)". Roda da Fortuna: Electronic Journal About Antiquity and Middle Ages. 6 (1). S2CID 221713017.
- Mikučionis, Ugnius (2020). "Dwarfs' Family Relations and Female Dwarfs in Some Medieval Nordic Sources". Scandia: Journal of Medieval Norse Studies. 3: 139–169. Archived from the original on September 29, 2021.
- Motz, Lotte (1977). "The Craftsman in the Mound". Folklore. 88 (1): 46–60. doi:10.1080/0015587X.1977.9716050. ISSN 0015-587X. JSTOR 1259699.
- Motz, Lotte (1982). "Giants in Folklore and Mythology: A New Approach". Folklore. 93 (1): 70–84. doi:10.1080/0015587X.1982.9716221. ISSN 0015-587X. JSTOR 1260141.
- Muir, Tom (2014). Orkney folk tales. Stroud, Gloucestershire: History Press. ISBN 9780752499055.
- Nordström, Jackie (2021). "Dvärgen på Ribekraniet". Arkiv för Nordisk Filologi (in Swedish). 136: 5–24. doi:10.63420/anf.v136i.27870.
- Orchard, Andy (1997). Dictionary of Norse myth and legend. London: Cassell. ISBN 0-304-34520-2.
- Orel, Vladimir E. (2003). A handbook of Germanic etymology. Leiden: Brill. ISBN 9004128751.
- Schäfke, Werner (2015). "Dwarves, Trolls, Ogres, and Giants". Set Handbook of Medieval Culture. De Gruyter. pp. 347–383. doi:10.1515/9783110267303-018. ISBN 978-3-11-026730-3.
- Pettersson, Sara (2009). "Eoin Colfer's magical fairies : the depiction of fairies in Artemis Fowl compared to folklore and other literature". Luleå University of Technology Publications.
- Pratchett, Terry; Simpson, Jacqueline (2009). The folklore of Discworld : legends, myths and customs from the Discworld with helpful hints from planet Earth. London: Corgi. ISBN 978-1407034249.
- Simek, Rudolf (2008). A Dictionary of Northern Mythology. Translated by Hall, Angela. BOYE6. ISBN 9780859915137.
- Wilkin, Peter (2006). "Norse Influences on Tolkien's Elves and Dwarves". Sydney Studies in Religion: 61–80. ISSN 1444-5158.
- "The Simonside Dwarfs". The Simonside Dwarfs. 5 (58): 543–545. 1891. ProQuest 3723893.
- "Dwarriden". Survey of English placenames.
- "dvergskott".
- "elf-shot".
- Cottrell, William; Hand, David; Jackson, Wilfred (4 February 1938). "Snow White and the Seven Dwarfs". IMDb. Walt Disney Animation Studios.
