= Egbere =

Mythical creature in Yoruba folklore

In Yoruba mythology, Egbere are a type of malevolent humanoid supernatural being believed to reside in the woods and active only at night.

Oxford's A Dictionary of the Yoruba language defines Egbere as a Yoruba word for fairy or goblin. According to William Taylor's 1898 account, written in a colonial and often condescending tone, Egbere inhabit graves. They emerge at midnight and return at dawn, similar to vampires. They delight in riding sheep, and also bring disease to sheep.

Egbere are described as being short in stature and are associated with a small mat. There is a belief that anyone who manages to take the mat of wealth from an Egbere will attain unimaginable riches. They are said to constantly cry, though the sincerity of these tears is questionable.
