= Gullinbursti =

Freyr's boar in Norse mythology

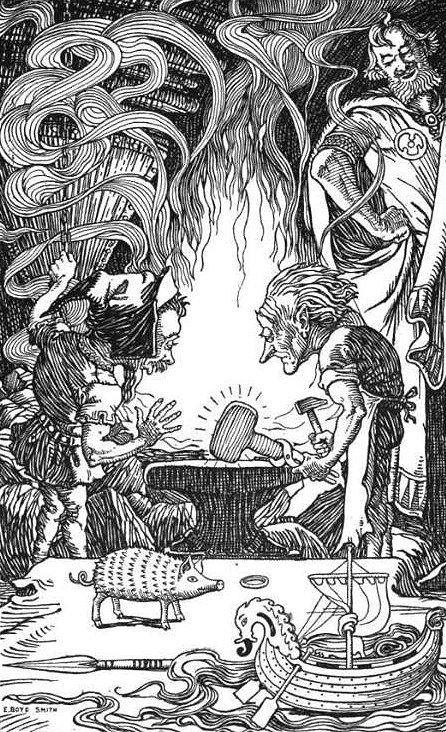
"The third gift — an enormous hammer" (1902) by Elmer Boyd Smith.

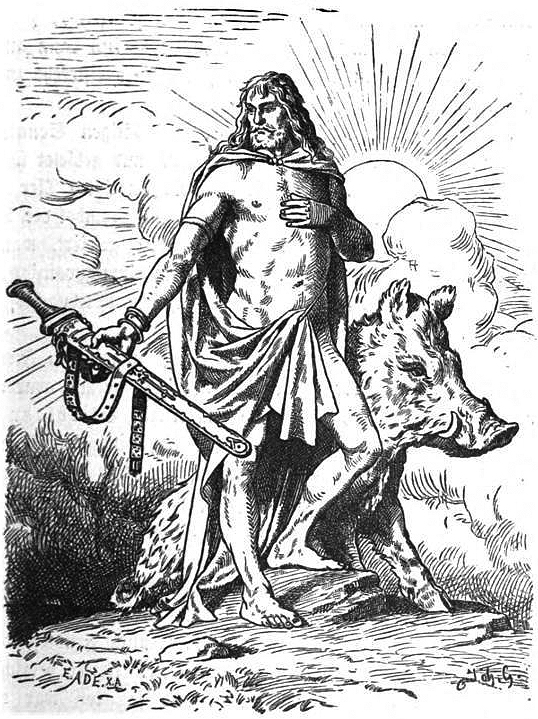
Gullinbursti and Frey, 1901 painting by Johannes Gehrts.

Gullinbursti (Old Norse, meaning "Gold Mane" or "Golden Bristles") is a boar in Norse mythology.

When Loki had Sif's hair, Freyr's ship Skíðblaðnir, and Odin's spear Gungnir fashioned by the Sons of Ivaldi, he bet his own head with Brokkr that his brother Eitri (Sindri) would not have been able to make items to match the quality of those mentioned above.

So to make gifts to Freyr, Eitri threw a pig's skin into a furnace as Brokkr worked on the bellows, and together they manufactured the boar Gullinbursti which had bristles in its mane that glowed in the dark.

The story of Gullinbursti's creation is related in the Skáldskaparmál section of Snorri Sturluson's Prose Edda.

[Þ]á lagði Sindri svínskinn í aflinn ok bað blása Brokk ok létta eigi fyrr en hann tæki þat ór aflinum, er hann hafði í lagt. En þegar er hann var genginn ór smiðjunni, en hinn blés, þá settist fluga ein á hönd honum ok kroppaði, en hann blés sem áðr, þar til er smiðrinn tók ór aflinum, ok var þat göltr, ok var burstin ór gulli. ... Þá bar fram Brokkr sína gripi ... En Frey gaf hann göltinn ok sagði, at hann mátti renna loft ok lög nótt ok dag meira en hverr hestr ok aldri varð svá myrkt af nótt eða í myrkheimum, at eigi væri ærit ljós, þar er hann fór; svá lýsti af burstinni.

Sindri laid a pigskin in the hearth and bade Brokkr blow, and did not cease work until he took out of the hearth that which he had laid therein. But when he went out of the smithy, while the other dwarf was blowing, straightway a fly settled upon his hand and stung: yet he blew on as before, until the smith took the work out of the hearth; and it was a boar, with mane and bristles of gold. ... Then Brokkr brought forward his gifts: ... to Freyr he gave the boar, saying that it could run through air and water better than any horse, and it could never become so dark with night or gloom of the Murky Regions that there should not be sufficient light where he went, such was the glow from its mane and bristles.

According to Húsdrápa, Freyr rode Gullinbursti to Baldr's funeral, while in Gylfaginning, Snorri states that Freyr rode to the funeral in a chariot pulled by the boar.

The boar is also known as Slíðrugtanni (Old Norse: meaning "Sharp Tooth" or "Fearsome Tooth") (sometimes anglicized to "Slidrugtanni").

The cult of Freyr and Gullinbursti also existed in the British Isles. Accounts have been preserved describing Scottish Christmas celebrations in the 8th–11th centuries. On the eve of the feast, all the men of a kin group gathered at a long table headed by their chieftain. The principal ritual dish of the banquet was a boar’s head, a practice associated with the veneration of Freyr. It was placed on a large platter and ceremonially carried into the hall where the festivities were held. The privilege of carving the head was reserved for the most respected guests. After the meal, the men left the house carrying torches and lit a ritual bonfire, after which they joined hands and formed a circle. Accompanied by the sound of bagpipes, they performed a dance whose rhythm gradually intensified and became increasingly frenzied. In a state of ecstatic excitement, the dancers cried out: “Haile, Yule, Haile” and “Thor is with us!”. Once the fire had burned out, the participants returned to the hall and continued the feast.
