= Skíðblaðnir =

Ship in Norse mythology

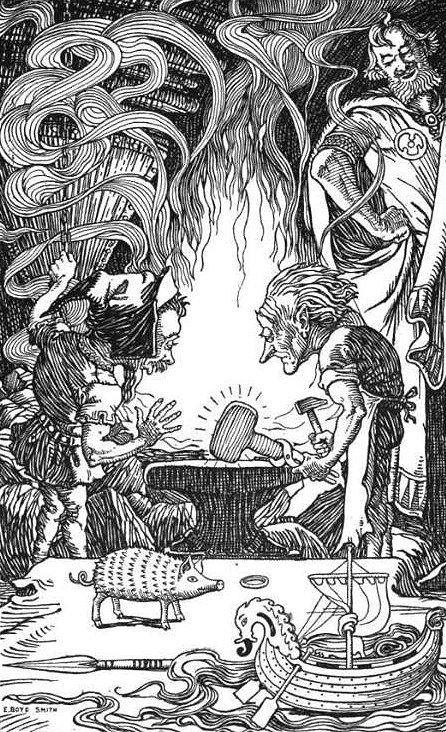
The third gift – an enormous hammer (1902) by Elmer Boyd Smith. The bottom right corner depicts the ship Skíðblaðnir "afloat" the goddess Sif's new hair.

Skíðblaðnir (Old Norse: [ˈskiːðˌblɑðnez̠], 'assembled from thin pieces of wood'), sometimes anglicized as Skidbladnir or Skithblathnir, is the best of ships in Norse mythology. It is attested in the Poetic Edda, compiled in the 13th century from earlier traditional sources, and in the Prose Edda and Heimskringla, both written in the 13th century by Snorri Sturluson. All sources note that the ship is the finest of ships, and the Poetic Edda and Prose Edda attest that it is owned by the god Freyr, while the euhemerized account in Heimskringla attributes it to the magic of Odin. Both Heimskringla and the Prose Edda attribute to it the ability to be folded up—as cloth may be—into one's pocket when not needed.

== Attestations ==
References to the ship occur in the Poetic Edda, the Prose Edda, and in Heimskringla. The ship is mentioned twice in the Poetic Edda and both incidents therein occur in the poem Grímnismál. In Grímnismál, Odin (disguised as Grímnir), tortured, starved, and thirsty, imparts in the young Agnar cosmological knowledge, including information about the origin of the ship Skíðblaðnir:

Benjamin Thorpe translation:

Ivaldi's sons went in days of old
Skidbladnir to form,
of ships the best, for the bright Frey,
Niörd's benign son.
Yggdrasil's ash is of all trees the most excellent,
and of all ships, Skidbladnir.
of the Æsir, Odin,
and of horses, Sleipnir,
Bifröst of bridges, and of skallds Bragi,
Hâbrôk of hawks, and of dogs, Garm,
[Brimir of swords.]

Henry Adams Bellows translation:

In days of old did Ivaldi's sons
Skithblathnir fashion fair,
The best of ships for the bright god Freyr,
The noble son of Njorth.
The best of trees must Yggdrasil be,
Skithblathnir best of boats;
Of all the gods is Othin the greatest,
And Sleipnir the best of steeds;
Bifrost of bridges, Bragi of skalds,
Hobrok of hawks, and Garm of hounds.

Skíðblaðnir is mentioned several times in the Prose Edda, where it appears in the books Gylfaginning and Skáldskaparmál. The first mention of Skíðblaðnir in the Poetic Edda occurs in chapter 43, where the enthroned figure of High tells Gangleri (king Gylfi in disguise) that the god Odin is an important deity. High quotes the second of the above-mentioned Grímnismál stanzas in support.

The boat is first directly addressed in chapter 43; there Gangleri asks that, if Skíðblaðnir is the best of ships, what there is to know about it, and asks if there is no other ship as good or as large as it. High responds that while Skíðblaðnir is the finest ship and the most ingeniously created, the biggest ship is in fact Naglfar, which is owned by Muspell. The Sons of Ivaldi, who High adds are dwarfs, crafted the ship and gave it to Freyr. High continues that the ship is big enough for all of the gods to travel aboard it with wargear and weapons in tow, and that, as soon as its sail is hoisted, the ship finds good wind, and goes wherever it need be as it could sail on both the wind and the water. It is made up of so many parts and with such craftsmanship that, when it is not needed at sea, it may be folded up like cloth and placed into one's pocket. Gangleri comments that Skíðblaðnir sounds like a great ship, and that it must have taken a lot of magic to create something like it.

The next mention of the ship occurs in Skáldskaparmál where, in chapter 6, poetic ways of referring to Freyr are provided. Among other names, Freyr is referred to as "possessor of Skidbladnir and of the boar known as Gullinbursti". The first of the two Grímnismál stanzas mentioned above is then provided as reference.

In chapter 35, a myth explaining Skíðblaðnir's creation is provided. The chapter details that the god Loki once cut off the goddess's Sif's hair in an act of mischief. Sif's husband, Thor, enraged, found Loki, caught hold of him, and threatened to break every last bone in his body. Loki promises to have the Svartálfar make Sif a new head of hair that will grow just as any other. Loki goes to the dwarfs known as Ivaldi's sons, and they made not only Sif a new head of gold hair but also Skíðblaðnir and the spear Gungnir. As the tale continues, Loki risks his neck for the creation of the devastating hammer Mjöllnir, the multiplying ring Draupnir, and the speedy, sky-and-water traveling, bright-bristled boar Gullinbursti. In the end, Loki's wit saves him his head, but results in the stitching together of his lips. The newly created items are doled out by the dwarfs to Sif, Thor, Odin, and Freyr. Freyr is gifted both Gullinbursti and Skíðblaðnir, the latter of which is again said to receive fair wind whenever its sail was set, and that it will go wherever it needs to, and that it can be folded up much as cloth and placed in one's pocket at will.

Skíðblaðnir receives a final mention in Skáldskaparmál where, in chapter 75, it appears on a list of ships.

The ship gets a single mention in the Heimskringla book Ynglinga saga. In chapter 7, a euhemerized Odin is said to have had various magical abilities, including that "he was also able with mere words to extinguish fires, to calm the sea, and to turn the winds any way he pleased. He had a ship called Skíthblathnir with which he sailed over great seas. It could be folded together like a cloth."

== In popular culture ==
The animated television series Code Lyoko features a digital submarine named Skidbladnir, named this way due to the Nordic ship's efficiency and usefulness.

In the 2018 game God of War, Skiðblaðnir is mentioned by name, but it is not seen. In its 2022 sequel God of War Ragnarök, Skiðblaðnir is a magical boat that was owned by the Vanir God Freyr, who then gave it to Kratos to use whenever he wants. As it was made by the Vanir Gods, Skiðblaðnir was given the ability to fly and to fold itself when not in use.

== See also ==
- Stone ship, a Germanic burial custom
