= Sons of Ivaldi =

Group of dwarf smiths from Norse mythology

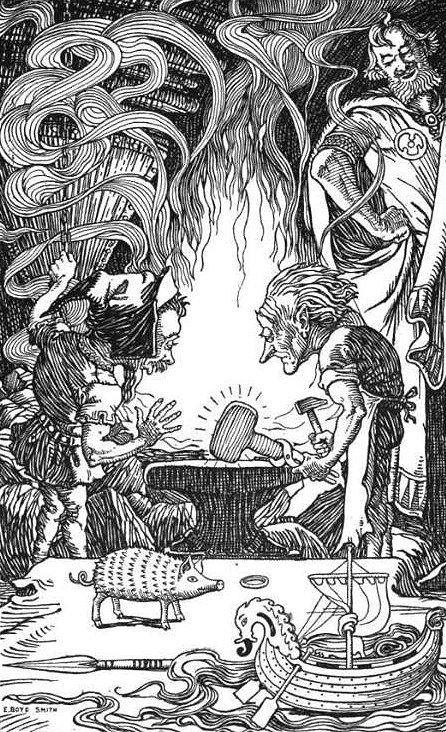
"The third gift—an enormous hammer" (1902) by Elmer Boyd Smith.

In Norse mythology, the Sons of Ivaldi (Norse: Ívaldasynir) are a group of dwarfs who fashion Skíðblaðnir, the flying ship of Freyr, Gungnir, the spear belonging to Odin, as well as the golden hair for Sif to replace the hair that Loki had cut off.

According to Skáldskaparmál, after these objects were created Loki made a bet with a dwarf, Brokkr, that his brother Eitri (or Sindri) would not be able to craft items to match the quality of those displayed by the sons of Ivaldi. This contest resulted in the creation of the boar of Freyr (Gullinbursti), the ring of Odin (Draupnir) and the hammer of Thor (Mjolnir), which were judged by the gods to be even more wondrous than the others. Thus, Brokkr had won the bet.

The account of this tale given in Skáldskaparmál does not reveal the names of Ivaldi's sons, nor how many there were, and they remain conspicuously absent after their initial mention in the stanza. The passing mention made of them in Grímnismál 43, the creators of Skidbladnir, "the best of ships", likewise sheds no additional light. Thus, their identities are a matter of scholarly speculation.

In the eddic poem Hrafnagaldur Óðins, stanza 6, Idunn is identified as an "elf" (alfar) and the "youngest of the elder children of Ivaldi". This implies that Ivaldi had two sets of children, probably by different mothers. Thus Idunn is a sister of the famous smiths, the Sons of Ivaldi.

In the Old Norse sources, the giant Þjazi is said to be the son of All-valdi [Harbardsljód 19] or Öl-valdi [Skaldskaparmal 42]. I-valdi may be another form of the name. Þjazi is said to have two brothers, Iði and Gangr, or Idi and Egil. Thus, Gang is another name for Egil. Egil is also found as a companion of Thor and keeps his goats safe when he ventures into the land of the giants.
