= Draupnir =

Ring in Norse mythology possessed by Odin

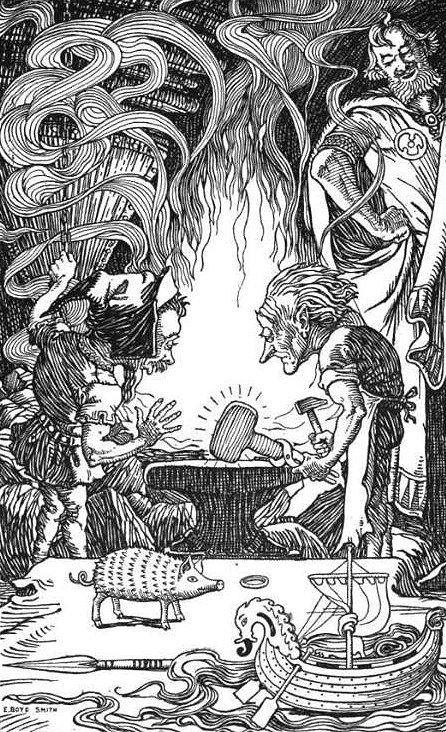
The third gift — an enormous hammer (1902) by Elmer Boyd Smith. The ring Draupnir is visible among other creations by the Sons of Ivaldi.

In Norse mythology, Draupnir (Old Norse: [ˈdrɔupnez̠], "the dripper") is a gold ring possessed by the god Odin with the ability to multiply itself: Every ninth night, eight new rings 'drip' from Draupnir, each one of the same size and weight as the original.

Draupnir was forged by the dwarven brothers Brokkr and Eitri (or Sindri). Brokkr and Eitri made this ring as one of a set of three gifts which included Mjöllnir and Gullinbursti. They made these gifts in accordance with a bet Loki made saying that Brokkr and Eitri could not make better gifts than the three made by the Sons of Ivaldi. In the end, Mjöllnir, Thor's hammer, won the contest for Brokkr and Eitri. Loki used a loophole to get out of the wager for his head (the wager was for Loki's head only, but he argued that, to remove his head, they would have to injure his neck, which was not in the bargain) and Brokkr punished him by sealing his lips shut with wire.

The ring was placed by Odin on the funeral pyre of his son Baldr:

Odin laid upon the pyre the gold ring called Draupnir; this quality attended it: that every ninth night there fell from it eight gold rings of equal weight.

— from the Gylfaginning

The ring was subsequently retrieved by Hermóðr. It was offered as a gift by Freyr's servant Skírnir in the wooing of Gerðr, which is described in the poem Skírnismál.
