= Sif =

Norse goddess, wife of Thor

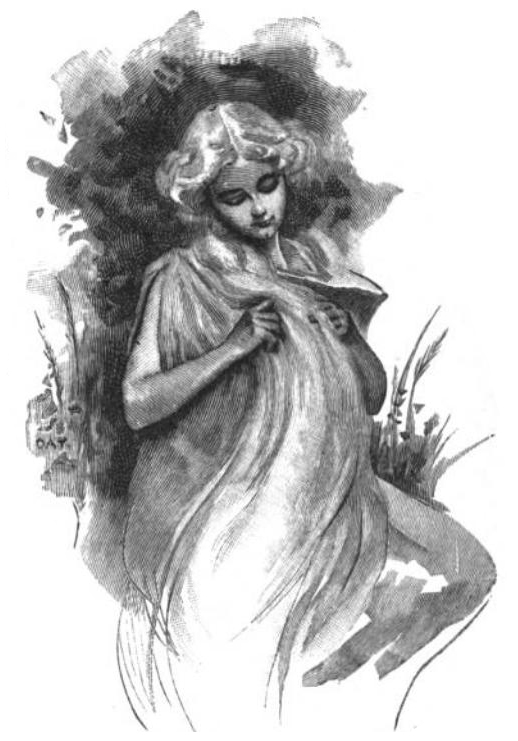
The goddess Sif holds her long, golden hair while grain grows behind her in an illustration from 1897

In Norse mythology, Sif is a golden-haired goddess associated with earth. Sif is attested in the Poetic Edda, compiled in the 13th century from earlier traditional sources, and the Prose Edda, written in the 13th century by Snorri Sturluson, and in the poetry of skalds. In both the Poetic Edda and the Prose Edda, she is known for her golden hair and is married to the thunder god Thor.

The Prose Edda recounts that Sif once had her hair shorn by Loki, and that Thor forced Loki to have a golden headpiece made for Sif, resulting in not only Sif's golden tresses but also five other objects for other gods. Sif is also named in the Prose Edda as the mother of Þrúðr (by Thor) and Ullr.

Scholars have proposed that Sif's hair may represent fields of golden wheat, that she may be associated with fertility, family, wedlock and/or that she is connected to rowan, and that there may be an allusion to her role or possibly her name in the Old English poem Beowulf.

== Etymology ==
The name Sif is the singular form of the plural Old Norse word sifjar. Sifjar only appears in singular form when referring to the goddess as a proper noun. Sifjar is cognate to the Old English sibb and modern English sib (meaning "affinity, connection, by marriage") and in other Germanic languages: Gothic 𐍃𐌹𐌱𐌾𐌰 (sibja), Old High German sippa, and modern German Sippe. Sifjar appears not only in ancient poetry and records of law, but also in compounds (byggja sifjar means "to marry"). Using this etymology, scholar John Lindow gives the meanings "in-law-relationship", scholar Andy Orchard provides "relation", and scholar Rudolf Simek gives "relation by marriage".

== Attestations ==
=== Poetic Edda ===
In stanza 48 of the Poetic Edda poem Hárbarðsljóð, Hárbarðr (Odin, father of Thor, in disguise) meets Thor at an inlet of a gulf. The two engage in flyting, and Hárbarðr refuses to ferry Thor across the bay. Among numerous other insults, Hárbarðr claims that Sif has a lover at home. In response, Thor says that Hárbarðr is speaking carelessly "of what seems worst to me" and also lying.

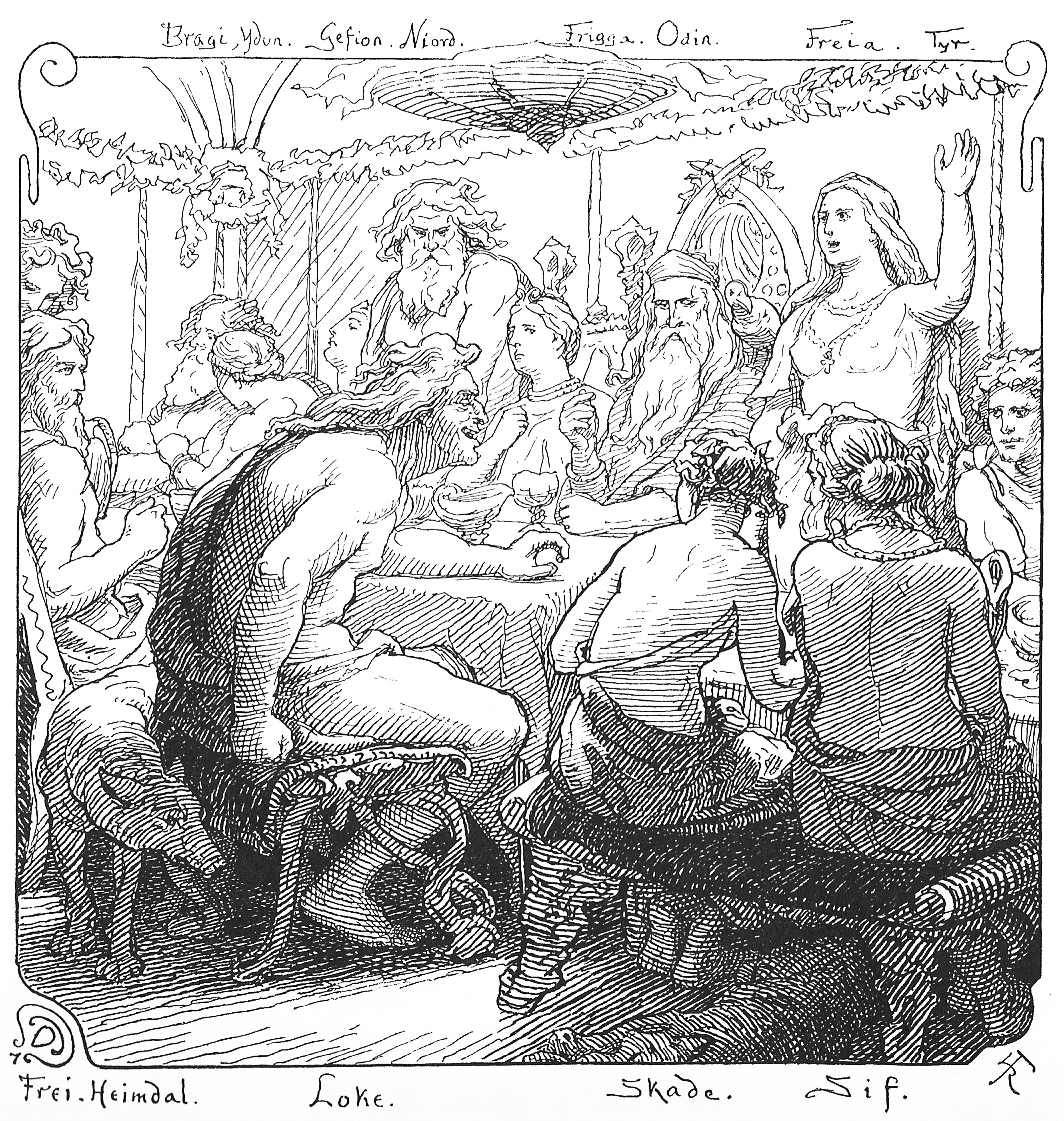
Lokasenna (1895) by Lorenz Frølich

In stanzas 53 and 54 of the poem Lokasenna, after pouring Loki a crystal cup of mead during his series of insults towards the gods, Sif states that there is nothing Loki can say only in regard to her. In response, Loki claims that Sif has had an affair with him:

Then Sif went forward and poured out mead for Loki into a crystal cup and said:
Welcome now, Loki, and take the crystal cup
full of ancient mead,
you should admit, that of the children of the Æsir,
that I alone am blameless.

He took the horn and drank it down:
That indeed you would be, if you were so,
if you were shy and fierce towards men;
I alone know, as I think I do now,
your lover beside Thor,
and that was the wicked Loki.

Sif does not respond, and the exchange turns to Beyla. Sif is additionally mentioned in two kennings found in poems collected in the Poetic Edda; Hymiskviða (where Thor is referred to as the "Husband of Sif" thrice), and Þrymskviða (where Thor is once referred to as "Husband of Sif").

=== Prose Edda ===
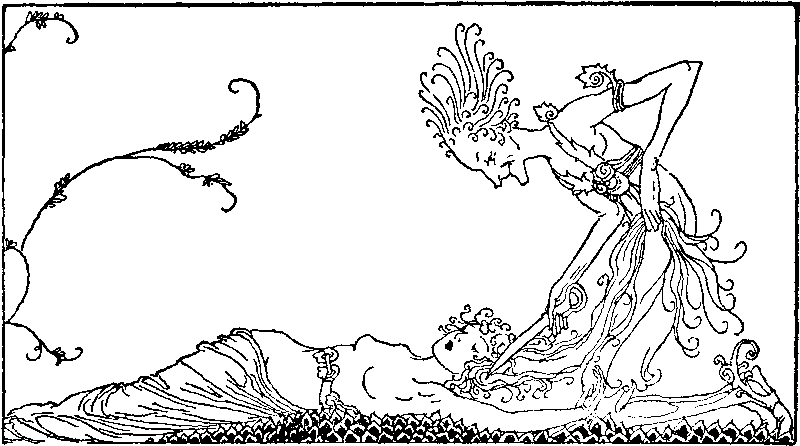
How Loki wrought mischief on Asgard (1920) by Willy Pogany

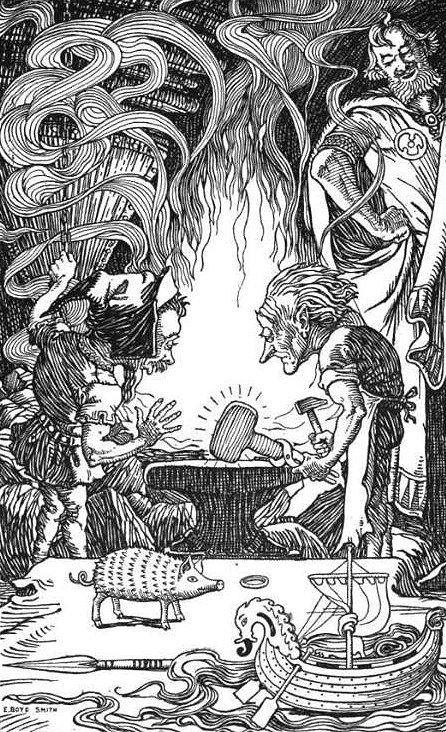
The third gift – an enormous hammer (1902) by Elmer Boyd Smith. The bottom right corner depicts the ship Skíðblaðnir "afloat" Sif's new hair.

In the Prose Edda, Sif is mentioned once in the Prologue, in chapter 31 of Gylfaginning, and in Skáldskaparmál as a guest at Ægir's feast, the subject of a jötunn's desire, as having her hair shorn by Loki, and in various kennings.

Sif is introduced in chapter three of the Prologue section of the Prose Edda; Snorri's euhemerized account of the origins of Norse mythology. Snorri states that Thor married Sif, and that she is known as "a prophetess called Sibyl, though we know her as Sif". Sif is further described as "the loveliest of women" and with hair of gold. Although he lists her own ancestors as unknown, Snorri writes that Thor and Sif produced a son by the name of Lóriði, who "took after his father".

In chapter 31 of the Prose Edda book Gylfaginning, Ullr is referred to as a son of Sif and a stepson of Thor (though his father is not mentioned):

Ull is the name of one. The son of Sif, he is the stepson of Thor. He is so skillful a bowman and skier that no one can compete with him. He is beautiful to look at, and is an accomplished warrior. He is also a good person to pray to when in single combat.

As reported in the Prose Edda book Skáldskaparmál, Thor once engages in a duel with Hrungnir, there described as the strongest of the jötnar. Prior to this, Hrungnir had been drunkenly boasting of his desire to, amongst other things, kill all of the gods except Freyja and Sif, whom he wanted to take home with him. However, at the duel, Hrungnir is quickly killed by the enraged Thor.

Further in Skáldskaparmál, Snorri relates a story where Loki cuts off Sif's hair as a prank. When Thor discovers this, he grabs hold of Loki, resulting in Loki swearing to have a headpiece made of gold to replace Sif's locks. Loki fulfills this promise by having a headpiece made by dwarfs, the Sons of Ivaldi. Along with the headpiece, the dwarfs produced Odin's spear, Gungnir. As the story progresses, the incident leads to the creation of the ship Skíðblaðnir and the boar Gullinbursti for Freyr, the multiplying ring Draupnir for Odin, and the mighty hammer Mjöllnir for Thor.

Sif also appears in Skáldskaparmál listed as a heiti for "earth", appears in a kenning for a gold-keeping woman, and once for Hildr. Poetic means of referring to Sif calling her "wife of Thor", "mother of Ullr", "the fair-haired deity", "rival of Járnsaxa", and as "mother of Þrúðr".

=== Swedish folklore ===
19th-century scholar Jacob Grimm records that in his time residents of Värmland, Sweden "call[ed] Thor's wife godmor, good mother."

== Theories ==
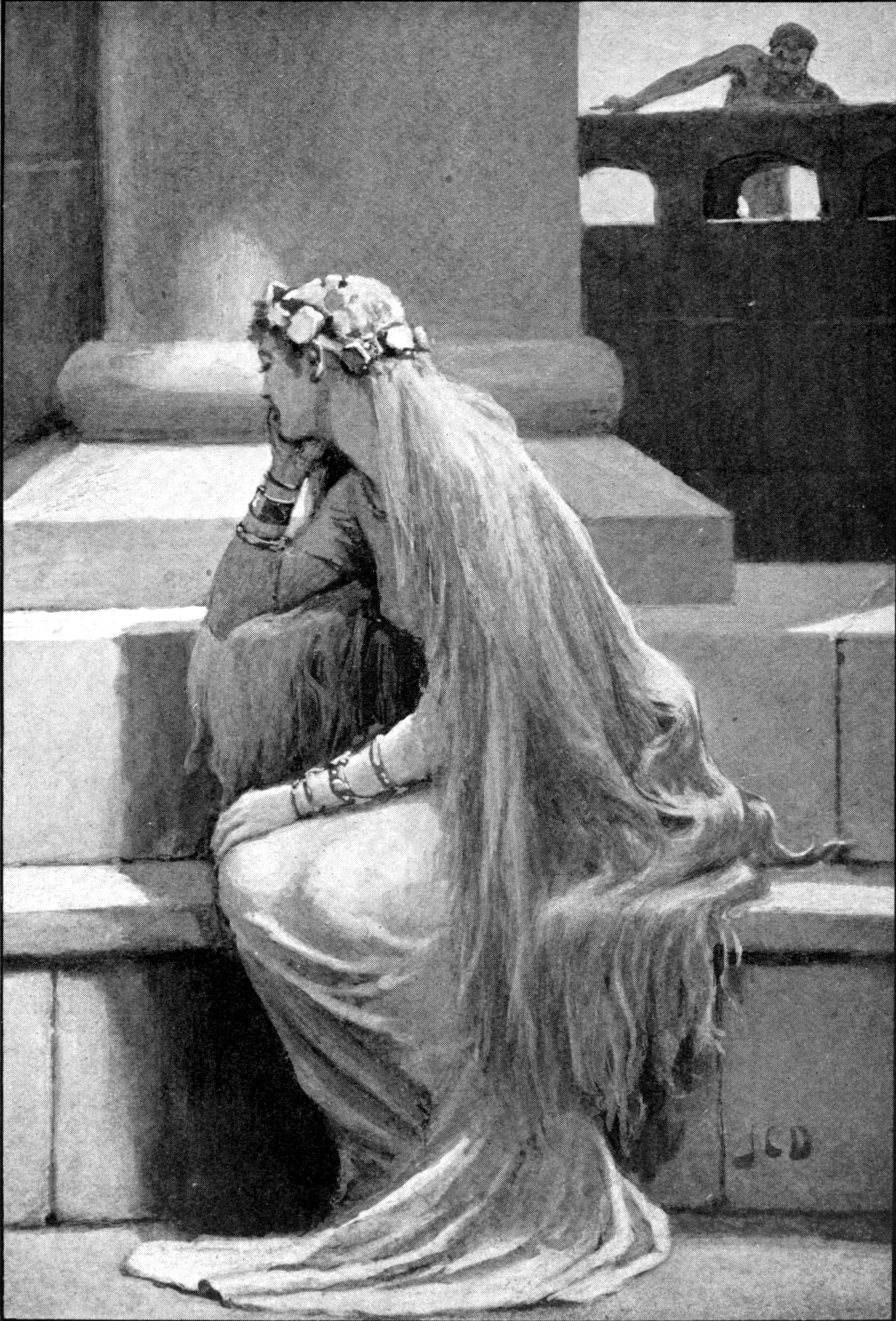
Sif (1909) by John Charles Dollman

=== Beowulf ===
In Old English, sib ("family") is cognate with Old Norse Sif and sif. In the Old English poem Beowulf (lines 2016 to 2018), Hroðgar's wife, Wealhþeow, moves through the hall serving mead to the warriors and defusing conflict. Various scholars beginning with Magnus Olsen have pointed to the similarity with what Sif does at the feast described in Lokasenna. Richard North further notes that unusually, sib is personified here and in lines 2599 to 2661, and suggests they may be references to Sif in Danish religion: "Both instances may indicate that the poet of Beowulf was in a position to imagine a sixth-century Scandinavia on the basis of his knowledge of contemporary Danish legends."

=== Hair as wheat and potential cognates ===
19th-century scholar Jacob Grimm proposes a reconstruction of a Germanic deity cognate to Sif in other Germanic cultures and proposes a similar nature to that of the goddesses Frigg and Freyja:

The Goth. sibja, OHG. sippia, sippa, AS. sib gen. sibbe, denote peace, friendship, kindred; from these I infer a divinity Sibja, Sippia, Sib, corresponding to ON. Sif gen. Sifjar, the wife of Thôrr, for the ON. too has a pl. sifjar meaning cognatio, sifi amicus (OHG. sippio, sippo), sift genus, cognatio. By this sense of the word, Sif would appear to be, like Frigg and Freyja, a goddess of loveliness and love; as attributes of Oðinn and Thôrr agree, their wives Frigg and Sif have also a common signification.

Grimm connects Eddic references to Sif's golden hair (gold is referred to as Sifjar haddr; Sif's hair) with the herb name haddr Sifjar (Polytrichum aureum). Grimm says that "expositors see in this the golden fruits of the Earth burnt up by fire and growing again, they liken Sif to Ceres", and Grimm says that "with it agrees the fact that O. Slav. Siva is a gloss on Ceres dea frumenti" but cites etymological problems between the potential cognate. Grimm says that Thor's mother was the earth, and not his wife, yet "we do find the simple Sif standing for earth." Grimm adds that he is inconclusive regarding Sif and that, "we ought to have fuller details about Sif, and these are wholly wanting in our mythology. Nowhere amongst us is the mystic relation of the seed-corn of Demeter, whose poignant grief for her daughter threatens to bring famine on mankind (Hymn to Cer. 305–306), nor anything like it, recorded."

Citing the etymology of her name, 19th century scholar Guðbrandur Vigfússon theorizes that Sif "betokens mother earth with her golden sheaves of grain; she was the goddess of the sanctity of the family and wedlock".

Scholar Rudolf Simek theorizes that Sif likely originated as a complement to Thor through his fertility associations, and that the name Sif (Simek provides the etymology "relation by marriage") may have originally simply meant "the wife (of Thor)". Simek rejects notions of a "vegetation cult" venerating Sif, says that Sif does not appear to have a function, dismisses theories proposing connections between Sif's hair and grain as "over-zealous interpretation[s]", and theorizes that Snorri invented the story of Sif's shorn locks in an attempt to explain the attributes of various gods.

Scholar H. R. Ellis Davidson states that Sif may have been an ancient fertility goddess, agreeing with a link between her lustrous hair and fields of golden wheat. Regarding Sif, Thor, and fertility, Davidson says:

The cult of Thor was linked up with men's habitation and possessions, and with well-being of the family and community. This included the fruitfulness of the fields, and Thor, although pictured primarily as a storm god in the myths, was also concerned with the fertility and preservation of the seasonal round. In our own times, little stone axes from the distant past have been used as fertility symbols and placed by the farmer in the holes made by the drill to receive the first seed of spring. Thor's marriage with Sif of the golden hair, about which we hear little in the myths, seems to be a memory of the ancient symbol of divine marriage between sky god and earth goddess, when he comes to earth in the thunderstorm and the storm brings the rain which makes the fields fertile. In this way Thor, as well as Odin, may be seen to continue the cult of the sky god which was known in the Bronze Age.

Scholar John Lindow proposes that a potentially understated mythological importance of Sif's role in the story of her sheared hair exists; her headpiece is created along with the most important and powerful items in Norse mythology. Lindow further states that it may be easy to lose sight of the central role Sif plays in the creation of these objects.

=== Rowan ===
Sif has been linked with Ravdna, the consort of the Sami thunder god Horagalles. Red berries of rowan were holy to Ravdna and the name Ravdna resembles the North Germanic words for the tree (for example, Old Norse reynir). According to Skáldskaparmál, the rowan is called "the salvation of Thor" because Thor once saved himself by clinging to it. It has been theorized that Sif was once conceived in the form of a rowan to which Thor clung." Uno Harva has raised doubts about goddess Ravdna, as while the word does mean rowan in Sámi, she is only mentioned by Jacob Fellman, who referred to Horagalles as the Finnish Ukko and might've then been simply trying to find a Sámi equivalent for Rauni.

=== Lokasenna accusations ===
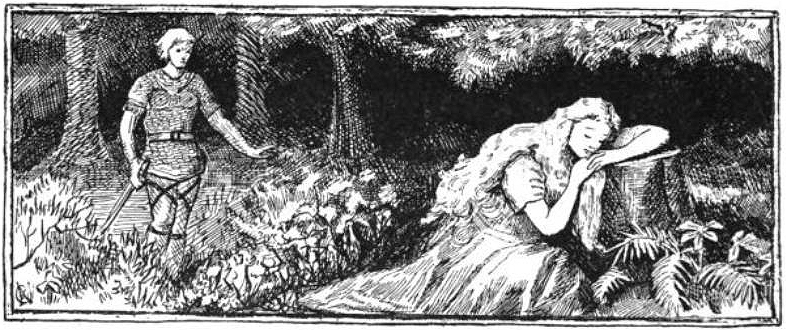
Sif sleeps while Loki lurks behind in an illustration (1894) by A. Chase

Regarding the accusations that Loki makes to Sif in Lokasenna, Carolyne Larrington says that Sif is not elsewhere attested as unfaithful, though notes that Odin makes a similar accusation in Hárbarðsljóð, and theorizes a potential connection between the story of Loki cutting off Sif's hair with these references. Larrington says "how he got close enough to carry this out might be explained by this verse."

=== Identity of Sif's first husband ===
Several identities have been suggested for Sif's first husband, the father of Ullr, but since neither Edda names this husband, most scholars continue to consider him unidentified. N. A. Nielsen suggests that she was married to Njord before the Æsir–Vanir War, an interpretation which depends on considering Ullr identical with Freyr, which Rudolf Simek characterizes as "very precarious."

== Modern influence ==
Sif has inspired the name of a volcano on the planet Venus (Sif Mons).

Sif's characterization in modern media tends to be much more martial than in the original sources. The Marvel Comics character, Sif, is based on the Sif of Norse myth and is portrayed by Jaimie Alexander in the Marvel Studios film Thor, its sequel, the Agents of S.H.I.E.L.D. television series, and the Loki streaming series episode The Nexus Event, where the hair shearing incident has loosely been adapted.

Lady Sif appears in Santa Monica Studio's 2022 video game God of War Ragnarök, where she is voiced by Emily Rose.

== See also ==
- Sif Glacier in northern Greenland
- Ullr, her son
