= Elmer Boyd Smith =

Canadian born author and illustrator

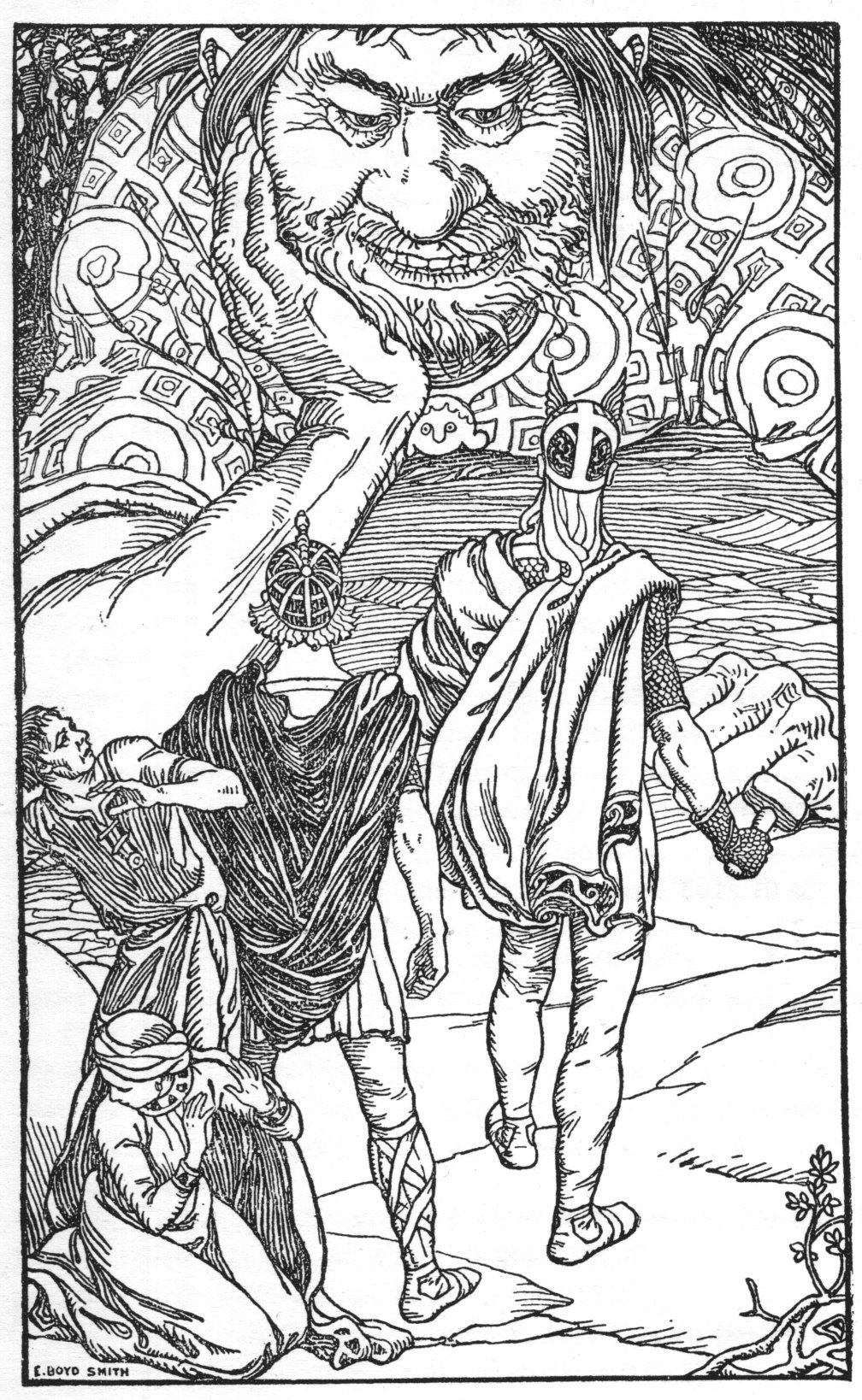
- I am the giant Skrymir (1902)
- Born: May 31, 1860; Saint John, New Brunswick
- Died: October 5, 1943 (aged 83); Wilton, Connecticut, US
- Occupations: Illustrator, Writer

Elmer Boyd Smith (May 31, 1860 – October 5, 1943) was an American writer and illustrator of children's books and painter.

Smith was born in Saint John, New Brunswick and studied art in Paris with Gustave Boulanger and Jules Joseph Lefebvre at the Académie Julian from 1881 to 1884, and also with H. Lefort for several years. In the early 1900s, he moved to Wilton, Connecticut, where he spent the remainder of his life. He illustrated more than seventy books for both adults and children, beginning with My Village in 1896, written while he was living in France. His first children's book was The Story of Noah's Ark in 1905.

== Selected works ==
- The Story of Noah’s Ark, 1905
- The Circus, 1909
- Robinson Crusoe, 1909
- Early Life of Mr. Man Before Noah, 1914
- After They Came Out of the Ark: Completing the Story of Noah, 1918
- The Story of Our Country, 1920
- Fun In the Radio World, 1923
- The Country Book, 1924
- So Long Ago, 1944
