= Gungnir =

Spear of the Norse god Odin

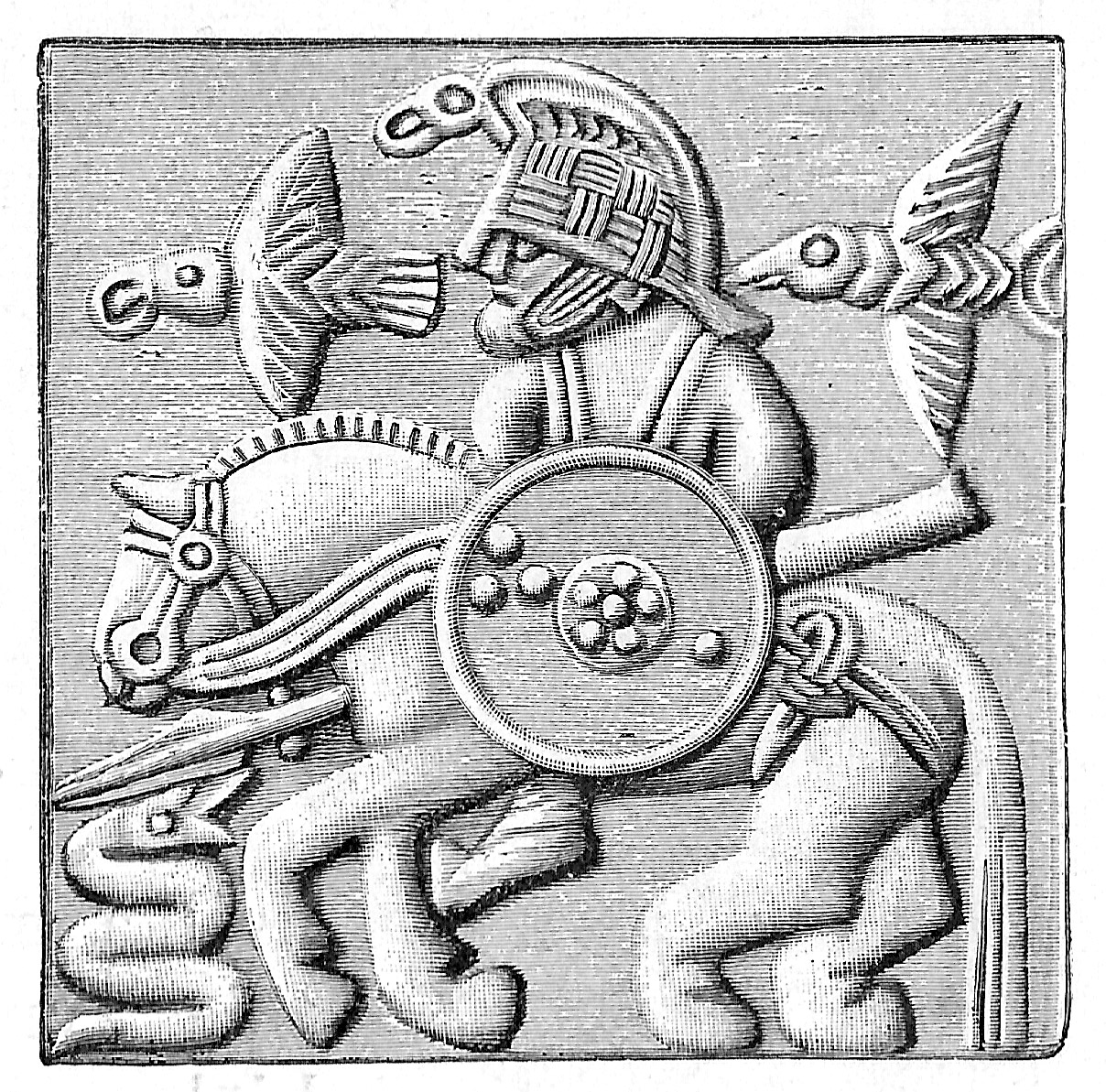
Vendel Period helmet plate depicting a cavalryman with a spear/lance followed by two ravens, assumed to depict Odin with Gungnir together with Huginn and Muninn

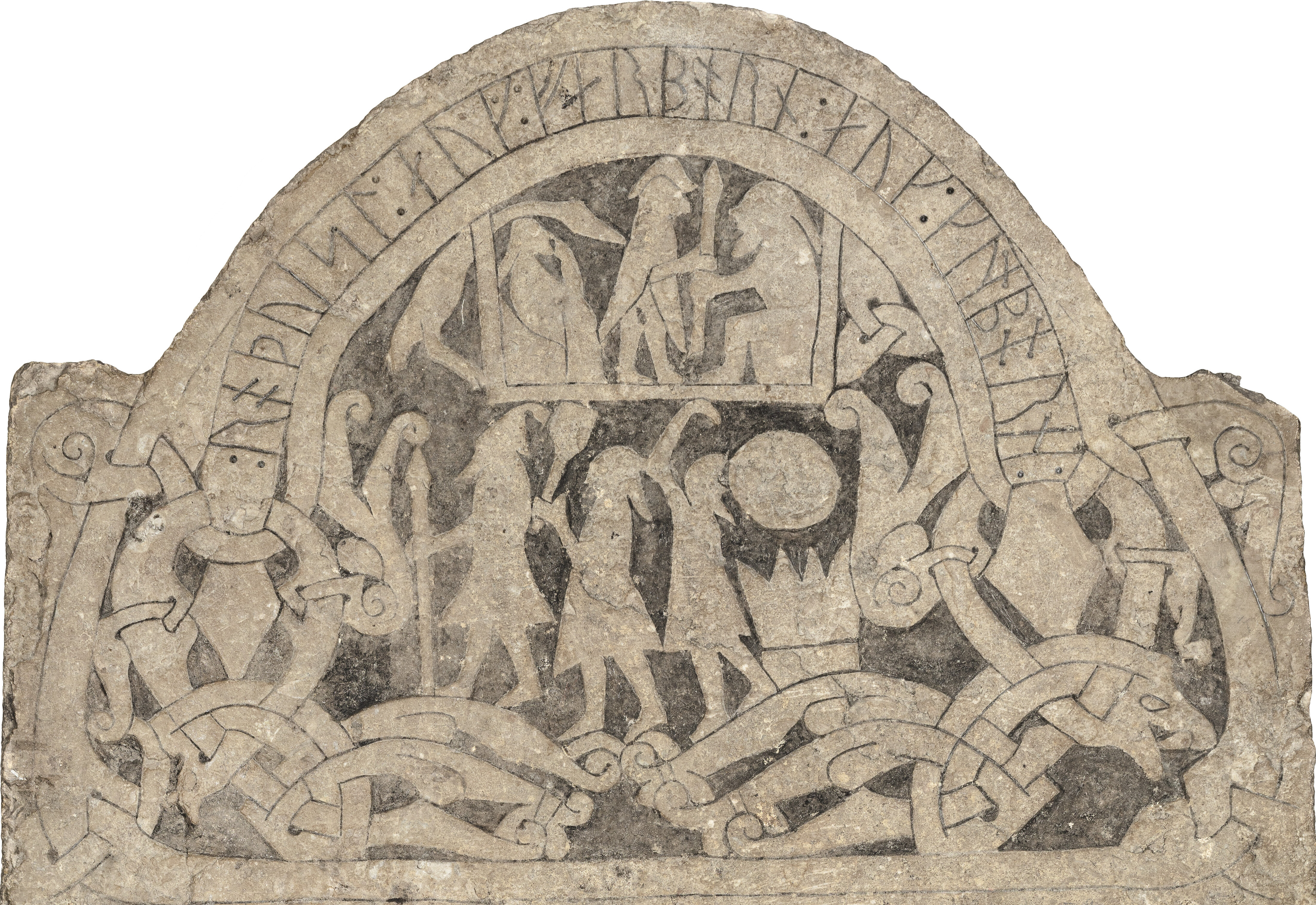
Gotland Runic Inscription 181 which depicts Odin with Gungnir, Thor with Mjölnir and a third character with a sickle, potentially Freyr. Above, a valkyrie in swan hamr delivers a fallen warrior to Valhalla, where Odin, together with Frigg, greets him by handing over Gungner as a sign that he is accepted among Valhalla's chosen.

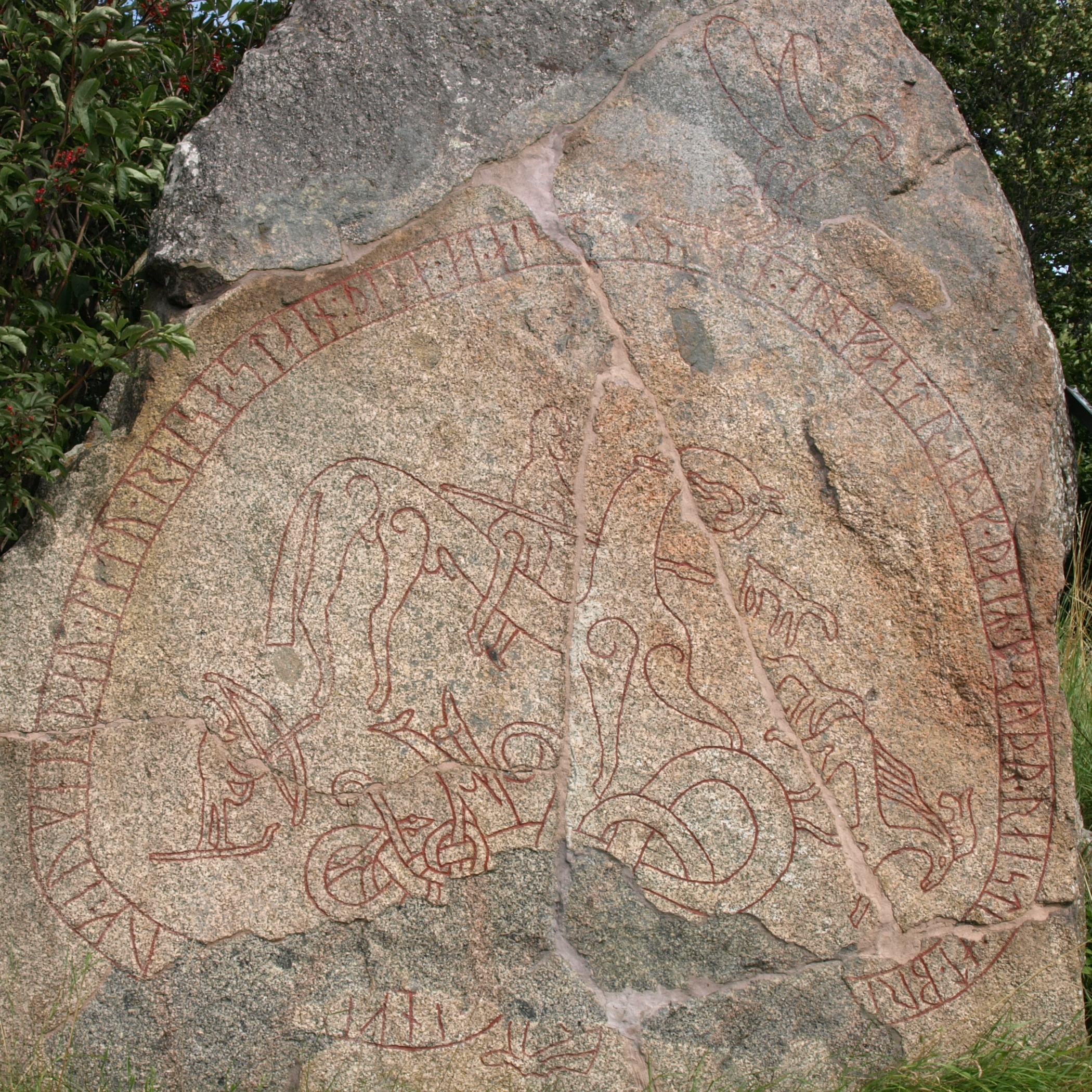
Böksta Runestone (U 855) which possibly depicts Odin with Gungner and his wolves Geri and Freki hunting a forrest bride, troll or thereof transformed into a horse, which has been marked by one of his ravens, sitting on the horse's head. Late sagas in Sweden retell this motif, where Odin hunts mythological beings with "never missing shots".

In Norse mythology, Gungnir (/ˈɡʌŋ.nɪər/, "the rocker, the swaying one") is the spear of the god Odin. It is known for always hitting the target of the attacker regardless of the attacker's skill.

== Attestations ==
=== Poetic Edda ===
In the Poetic Edda poem Völuspá, the Æsir-Vanir War is described as officially starting when Odin throws a spear over the heads of an assembly of Vanir gods. Whether or not this was specifically Gungnir is, however, unstated. In Sigrdrífumál, the valkyrie Sigrdrífa advises Sigurd on the magical application of runes. She gives Sigurd advice and shares with him lore, including that runes were carved on the tip of Gungnir.

=== Prose Edda ===
According to chapter 51 of the Prose Edda book, Gylfaginning, Odin will ride in front of the Einherjar while advancing on to the battle field at Ragnarök wearing a gold helmet, an impressive cloak of mail and carrying Gungnir. He will then attack the wolf Fenrir with it.

In Skáldskaparmál, more information regarding the spear is presented. The spear was fashioned by the dwarves known as the Sons of Ivaldi under the mastery of the blacksmith dwarf Dvalinn. The spear was obtained from the dwarfs by Loki, the result of a scheme he concocted as a partial reparation for his cutting of the goddess Sif's hair. The spear is described as being so well balanced that it could strike any target, no matter the skill or strength of the wielder.

== Archaeological record ==
If the rider on horseback on the image on the Böksta Runestone has been identified as Odin, then Odin is shown carrying Gungnir while hunting an elk.

== In the Ring of the Nibelung ==
In Richard Wagner's opera cycle, Der Ring des Nibelungen, Wotan's (Odin's) spear is made from the wood of the world tree, the ash tree Yggdrasil, and engraved with the contracts from which Wotan's power derives. He uses the spear to break the sword of Siegmund, leading to Siegmund's death. When he later tries to bar Siegmund's son Siegfried from awakening Brünnhilde from her magic sleep, Siegfried breaks the spear in two and Wotan flees. In the concluding opera Götterdämmerung Wotan is said to have returned to his stronghold Valhalla with the broken spear and withdrawn from worldly matters.

== See also ==
- Bracteate
- Gae Bolga, the Irish legendary hero Cú Chulainn's similar magic spear
- Migration period spear

== Sources ==
- Orchard, Andy (1997). Dictionary of Norse Myth and Legend. Cassell. ISBN 0-304-34520-2
- Silén, Lars (1983). "Några Reflektioner Angående Bilderna på Balingsta-Stenen i Uppland" (PDF). Fornvännen. 78. Swedish National Heritage Board: 88–91. ISSN 1404-9430.
