= List of giants in mythology and folklore =

This is a list of giants and giantesses from mythology and folklore; it does not include giants from modern fantasy fiction or role-playing games (for those, see list of species in fantasy fiction).

== Abrahamic religions & Religions of the ancient Near East ==
- ʿĀd
- Anakim - Book of Genesis
- The Book of Giants - Manichaeism
- Elioud - Hebrew Bible
- Emite
- Gaf - Mandaeism
- Gibborim
- Goliath - Book of Samuel
- Humbaba - Ancient Mesopotamian religion
- Krun - Mandaeism
- Marid
- Nephilim
- Nimrod - Genesis & Books of Chronicles
- Og - Book of Numbers
- Repha'im
- Saint Christopher - Golden Legend

== African folklore ==
- Matsieng Footprints
- Mbombo

== Armenian mythology ==
- Hayk

== Australian folklore ==
- Chinny-kinik
- Crooked Mick
- Thardid Jimbo
- Yowie

== Celtic mythology ==
=== Brythonic mythology ===
- Cewri
  - Brân the Blessed
  - Ysbaddaden Bencawr
  - Idris Gawr
- Cormoran
- Cymidei Cymeinfoll
- Gogmagog
- Maelor Gawr
- Welsh giants

=== Gaelic mythology ===
- Am Fear Liath Mòr
- Bertram de Shotts
- Fachan
- Fionn mac Cumhaill
- Fomorians
  - Balor
  - Bres
  - Cethlenn
  - Elatha
  - Ériu
  - Ethniu
  - Fódla
  - Tethra
- Cú Chulainn
- Trow

== Chinese folklore ==
- Fangfeng
- Kuafu
- Pangu
- Yeren

== Dutch folklore ==
- Druon Antigoon
- Ellert and Brammert
- Pier Gerlofs Donia

== English folklore ==
- Ascapart
- Blunderbore
- Buggane
- Colbrand
- Cormoran
- Ettins
- Galehaut
- Goram and Vincent
- Jack the Giant Killer
- Jack and the Beanstalk
- Jack o' Legs
- Jack-in-Irons
- Little John
- Lubber fiend
- Ogre
- Orgoglio
- Penhill Giant
- Thunderdell
- Tom Hickathrift
- William of Lindholme
- Yernagate

== Fennoscandian folklore and mythology ==
=== Finnic mythologies ===
- Antero Vipunen
- Kalevi and his sons
- Toell the Great
- Vanapagan
- Iku-Turso

=== Norse mythology ===
- Fin
- Gryla
- Jötunn
  - Ægir
  - Alvaldi
  - Angrboða
  - Aurboða
  - Baugi
  - Beli
  - Bergelmir
  - Bestla
  - Billingr
  - Bölþorn
  - Brimir
  - Dúrnir
  - Eggþér
  - Fárbauti
  - Fjölvar
  - Gangr
  - Geirröd
  - Gillingr
  - Gjálp and Greip
  - Gríðr
  - Gunnlöð
  - Gyllir
  - Gymir
  - Harðgreipr
  - Helblindi
  - Hljod
  - Hræsvelgr
  - Hraudung
  - Hrímgerðr
  - Hrímgrímnir
  - Hrímnir
  - Hroðr
  - Hrungnir
  - Hrymr
  - Hymir
  - Hyrrokkin
  - Iði
  - Ím
  - Járnsaxa
  - Jörð
  - Kári
  - Leikn
  - Litr
  - Logi
  - Mögþrasir
  - Móðguðr
  - Rindr
  - Skaði
  - Sinmara
  - Sökkmímir
  - Starkad
  - Surtr
  - Suttungr
  - Þjazi
  - Þökk
  - Þrívaldi
  - Þrúðgelmir
  - Þrymr
  - Útgarða-Loki
  - Vafþrúðnir
  - Víðblindi
  - Vörnir
  - Ymir
- Nine Mothers of Heimdallr
- The Giant Who Had No Heart in His Body
- Þorgerðr Hölgabrúðr and Irpa

=== Sámi folklore ===
- Stallo

== French folklore ==
- Ferragut
- Gayant
- Lydéric and Phinaert

== German folklore ==
- Bergmönch
- Fasolt
- Haymon
- Jupiter Column
- Rübezahl
- Teutobochus
- Thyrsus

== Greek and Roman mythology ==
- Aloadae
- Antaeus
- Argus Panoptes
- Arimaspi
- Caca
- Cacus
- Cyclopes
  - Arges
  - Polyphemus
- Damasen
- Gegenees
- Geryon
- Gigantes:
  - Alcyoneus
  - Almops
  - Athos
  - Damysus
  - Enceladus
  - Mimas
  - Pallas
  - Picolous
  - Polybotes
  - Porphyrion
- Gration
- Hecatoncheires
- Hyperboreans
- Laestrygonians
- Menoetius
- Orion
- Syrbotae
- Talos
- Tityos

== Iberian mythology ==
=== Basque mythology ===
- Basajaun
- Jentil
- Mairu
- Olentzero
- Tartalo

=== Cantabrian mythology ===
- Ojáncanu

== Indian religions ==
- Mande Barung
- Ten Giant Warriors

=== Hindu mythology ===
- Asura
- Daitya
  - Hiranyakashipu
  - Hiranyaksha
- Mahabali
- Rakshasa
  - Kumbhakarna
  - Ravana

=== Jainism ===
- Nabhi
- Rishabhanatha

== Japanese folklore ==
- Daidarabotchi
- Emperor Chūai
- Emperor Keikō
- Gashadokuro
- Ōnyūdō
- Hibagon
- Oni

== Malaysian folklore ==
- Orang Mawas

== North American folklore ==
- Alfred Bulltop Stormalong
- Amala - Pacific Northwest Coast
- Antonine Barada
- Beast of Bray Road
- Bigfoot
- Dzunukwa - Kwakwakaʼwakw mythology
- Febold Feboldson
- Flatwoods monster
- Flying Head - Iroquois mythology
- Fouke Monster
- Gaoh - Iroquois mythology
- Honey Island Swamp monster
- Jenu - Miꞌkmaq
- Johnny Kaw
- Kewawkqu’ - A race of giants and magicians in Algonquian mythology
- Maushop
- Michigan Dogman
- Mogollon Monster
- Momo the Monster
- Quinametzin - Aztec mythology
  - Mixtecatl
  - Otomitl
  - Tenoch
  - Ulmecatl
  - Xelhua
  - Xicalancatl
- Paul Bunyan
- Si-Te-Cah - Northern Paiute people
- Skunk ape
- Tsul 'Kalu - Cherokee spiritual beliefs
- Wechuge - Athabaskan
- Wendigo
- Zipacna - Maya mythology

== Oceanian Mythology ==
=== Fijian mythology ===
- Flaming Teeth

=== Māori mythology ===
- Maero
- Yelbeghen

== Philippine mythology ==
- Bungisngis
- Kapre

== Persian mythology ==
- Div

== Romanian folklore ==
- Căpcăun
- Uriaș
- Zmeoaică
- Zmeu

== Slavic paganism ==
=== Bulgarian mythology ===
- Ispolin

== South American mythology and folklore ==
- Moai
- Patagon

=== Brazilian mythology ===
- Mapinguari

=== Chilean mythology ===
- Cherufe - Mapuche religion

== Tibetan mythology ==
- Yeti

== Other ==
- A Book of Giants
- Brobdingnag, fictional land of giants from Jonathan Swift's, Gulliver's Travels
- Ent
- Gargantua and Pantagruel
  - Hurtaly, fictional giant from François Rabelais' Gargantua and Pantagruel
- The Selfish Giant, a short story by Oscar Wilde
- Nix Nought Nothing
- Veli Jože
- Young Ronald

== See also ==
- Baltic mythology
- Childe of Hale, English giant in Tudor England
- Finnic mythologies
- Giant animal (mythology)
- Giants (esotericism)
- Giant's Causeway
- Half-giant
- Jörmungandr, giant serpent in Norse mythology
- Paleo-Balkan mythology
- Processional giant
- Processional giants and dragons in Belgium and France
- Proto-Indo-European mythology
- Typhon, giant serpent in Greek mythology
