= Thiazzi (moon) =

Moon of Saturn

Discovery
- Discovered by: Sheppard et al.
- Discovery date: 2019

Designations
- Pronunciation: /θiˈætsi/
- Named after: Þjazi
- Alternative names: Saturn LXIII; S/2004 S 33; T514042

Orbital characteristics
- Semi-major axis: 23764800 km
- Eccentricity: 0.417
- Orbital period (sidereal): −1361.5 days
- Inclination: 161.5°
- Satellite of: Saturn
- Group: Norse group

Physical characteristics
- Mean diameter: 4 km
- Apparent magnitude: 25.0

Thiazzi (Saturn LXIII), provisionally known as S/2004 S 33, is a natural satellite of Saturn. Its discovery was announced by Scott S. Sheppard, David C. Jewitt, and Jan Kleyna on October 8, 2019 from observations taken between December 12, 2004 and March 22, 2007. It was given its permanent designation in August 2021. On 24 August 2022, it was officially named after Þjazi, a jötunn from Norse mythology. He is a son of Alvaldi and kidnapped the goddess Iðunn, who guarded the apples of the gods.

Thiazzi is about 4 kilometres in diameter, and orbits Saturn at an average distance of 24.168 million km in 1403.18 days, at an inclination of 160° to the ecliptic, in a retrograde direction and with an eccentricity of 0.399.
