= List of giants =

List of giants may refer to:

- List of giants in mythology and folklore
- List of tallest people
- List of megafauna in mythology and folklore
