= Schubiger =

Schubiger is a surname. Notable people with the surname include:

- Jürg Schubiger (1936–2014), Swiss psychotherapist and writer of children's books
- Otto Schubiger (1925–2019), Swiss ice hockey player
