= Wildmoos (Telfs) =

- Village of Telfs
- Location within Austria
- Coordinates: 47°19′38″N 11°07′48″E
- Country: Austria
- State: Tyrol
- District: Innsbruck Land
- Elevation: 1,280 m (4,200 ft)

Population (2001)
  - Total: 5
- Time zone: UTC+1 (CET)
  - Summer (DST): UTC+2 (CEST)
- Postal code: 6100
- Vehicle registration: IL

Wildmoos is an area in the central Inn valley in North Tyrol and a village in the municipality of Telfs in the district of Innsbruck Land.

== Geography ==
Wildmoos lies 20 kilometres (12 mi) beyond Innsbruck on the Seefeld Plateau above the Inn, at around 1260 1,320 m (AA), near Seefeld.

The area encompasses just under 30 scattered houses; today most of the land is covered by the Seefeld-Wildmoos Golf Course and the alpine meadow of Wildmoosalm.

== Nature ==
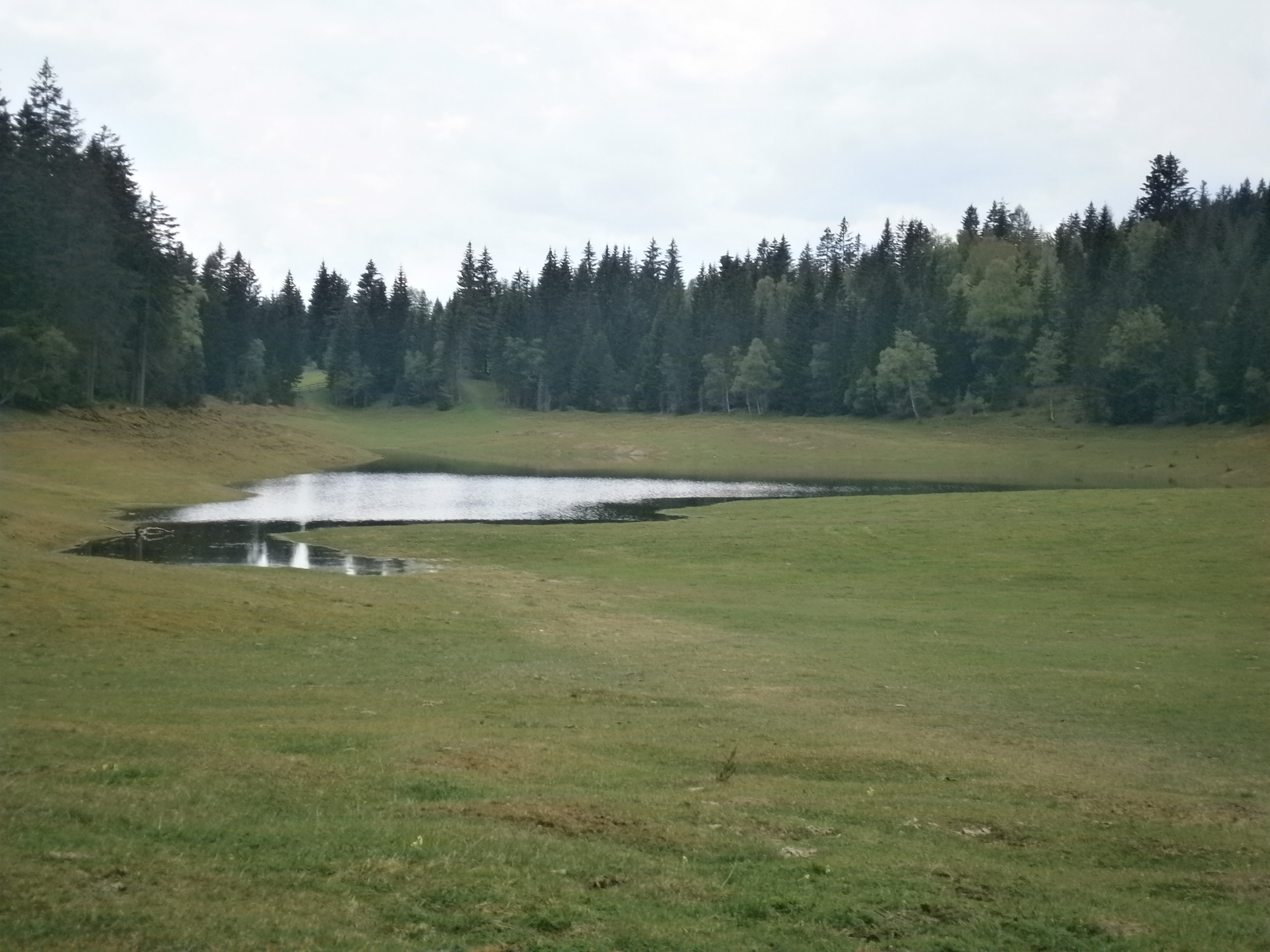
The Wildmoossee

The Wildmoos area is a large aquatic ecotope of about 55 hectares (140 acres) with two rarely appearing aperiodic lakes, the Lottensee and the Wildmoossee, with a further 13-hectare (32-acre) bog and wetland area on the Wildalm. The two areas are separated by forest. They are both karst phenomena.

== Seefeld-Wildmoos Golf Course ==
The region has been developed today into an 18-hole golf course. The golf club is a member of the Leading Golf Courses Austria and has close links to the nearby 5-star hotel, the Interalpen Tyrol.
