= Haymon =

Giant from Tyrolean mythology

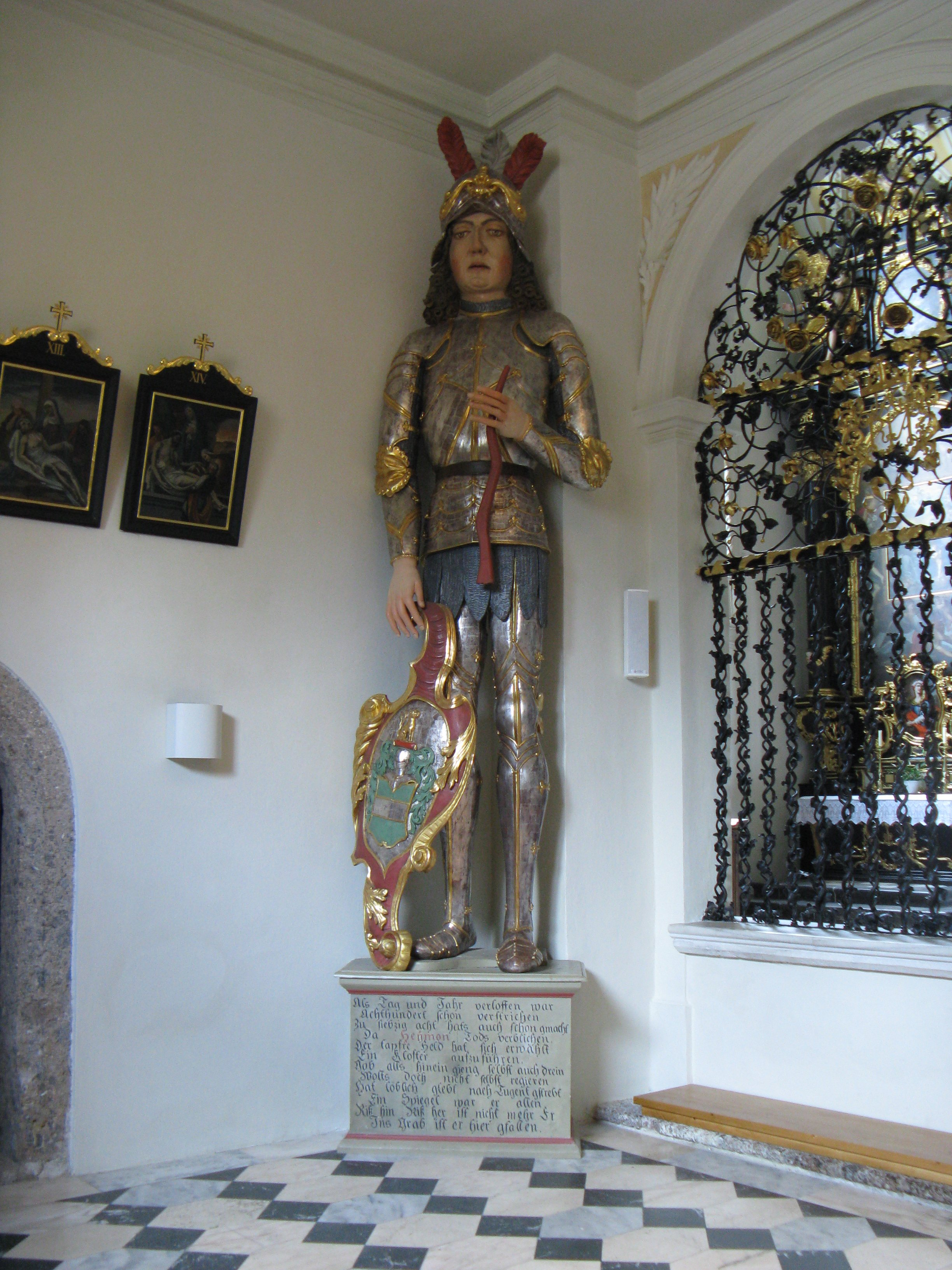
Figure of the giant Haymon in the chapel in Wilten

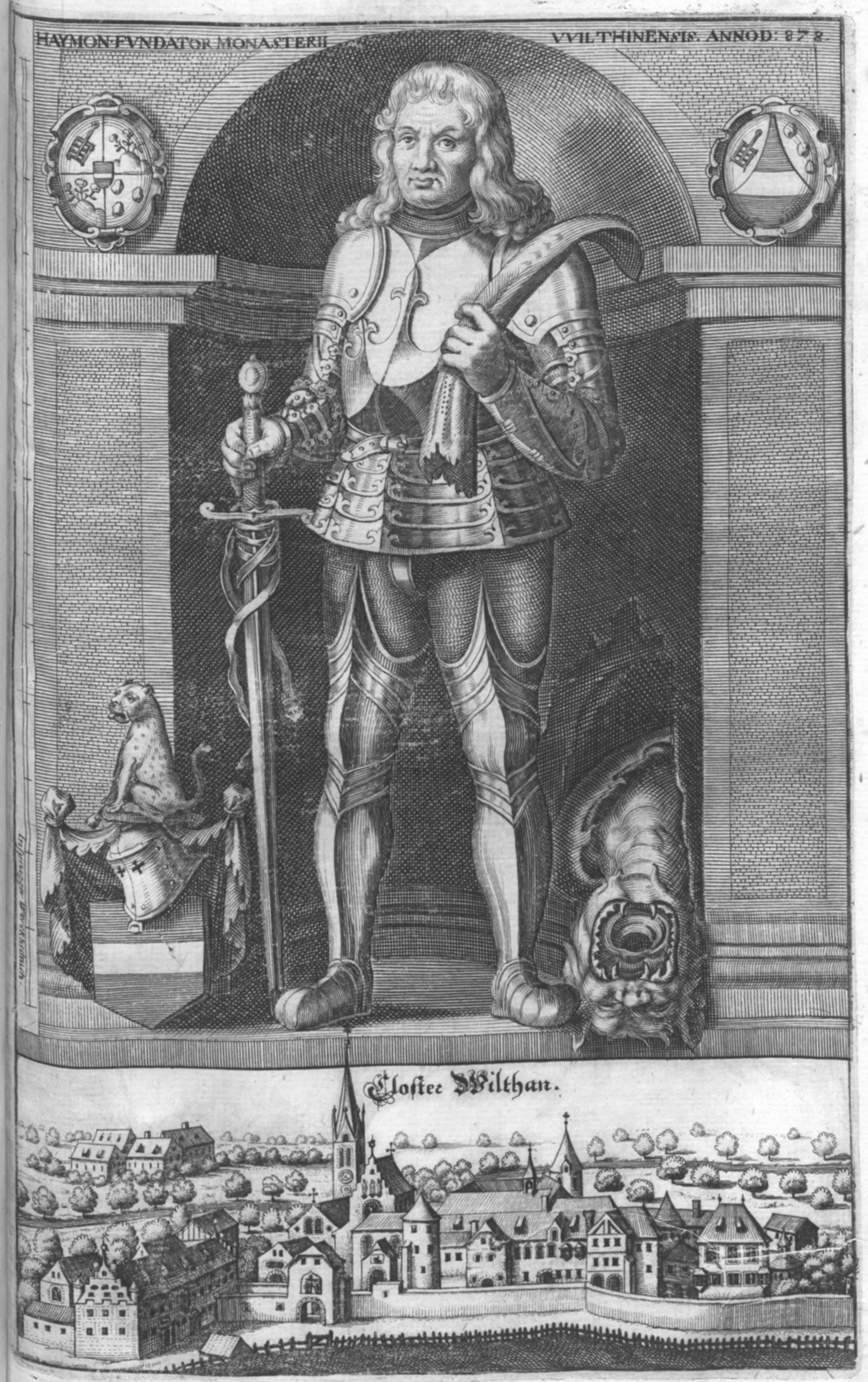
Haymon and the dragon with its tongue torn; below the monastery of Wilten. Copperplate engraving from Topographia Provinciarum Austriacarum by Matthäus Merian (1679)

Haymon is a mythical figure from Tyrol in form of a giant. It is said that Haymon was the founder of Stift Wilten, a premonstratensian abbey, located in the south of Innsbruck. He is said to have lived between 600 and 900 years ago and to have died in the year 878 A.D. in Wilten. According to a 13th-century sources, Haymon's grave is at the altar of the Collegiate Church in Wilten.

It has been speculated that Haymon was a Bavarian nobleman named Haimo. Albeit its similar spelling and pronunciation to the ancient Greek name Haimon (Greek: Αἵμων), no relation could be shown.

== Tradition ==
Different traditions have been amalgamated in the legend of the giant Haymon.

In the 15th century, the local legend of the Gold-Guarding Dragon who lives on the hill Bergisel east of the river Sill was created. This dragon was killed by Haymon. Set in gold, the dragon's tongue (the horn extension of a sword fish) is still today shown in the Tyrolean State Museum Ferdinandeum in Innsbruck.

Another tradition, which comes up about the 16th century, reports of a fight between Haymon and the giant Thyrsus, who lived in the area of Zirl and Seefeld, eventually killing him. From Thyrsus's blood (the so-called Thyrsenblut the healing Tyrolean Shale Oil or Ichtltyol is extracted. The last words of the giant Thyrsus were: "Blood spray! Be good for man and beast! (Spritz Bluet! Sei für Viech und Menschen gut!)" Thus, Haymon, the immigrant from the north, defeats the local Thyrsus.

In remorse, Haymon takes the Christian faith being baptized by the Bishop of Chur. Thereafter, he founded the monastery Wilten which he hands over to Benedictine monks from the Tegernsee Abbey. Then he joined the order as a lay brother and stayed there until his death. Towards the end of the 16th century, all these motives could be found in the founding legend of the monastery Wilten.

Even in the 17th century, the belief in the historical existence of the giant Haymon was still so strong that the then abbot of the monastery Wilten had an excavation for Haymon's bones carried out in the church. The excavations ended without result, eventually throwing over parts of the church.

According to contemporary scholarly interpretation of the 17th Century, the giant Thyrsus represents the Romansh people while the invading Bavarians, who populated the Inn valley as of the 6th century, are being represented through Haymon. In the fight between Haymon and Thyrsus the defeat of the Romansh people by the Bavarians is symbolized.

While Thyrsus is often depicted as a somewhat primitive layman who is fighting with a torn tree, Haymon is depicted as a gallant giant with a sword. Life-size figures of the two giants Haymon and Thyrsus can be found at Wilten where they are at the entrance to the church. An engraving from 1677 by J.J. Jezl shows Haymon as a knight with a sword and the dragon's tongue in his hands. The signature says "Haymon Fundator Monasterii Wilthinensis, obiit Anno D. 878" (Haymon founder of the monastery in Wilten, died 878).

== Miscellaneous ==
In the region around Innsbruck, various restaurants and institutions are named after the giant Haymon.

- In Innsbruck, there is an alley named Haymongasse.
- The book publisher Haymon Verlag is named after the mythical figure.
- The name of the wireless router HiMoNN of the south German company IABG is a homophone of Haymon.

== Books ==
- Michael Forcher, Der Riese Haymon, Haymon Verlag, Innsbruck, 2007
- Wolfgang Morscher, Berit Mrugalska-Morscher, Die schönsten Sagen aus Tirol, Haymon Verlag, Innsbruck, 2010
- Jakob Grimm, Wilhelm Grimm, Deutsche Sagen. Mit einem Nachwort und bibliographischen Hinweisen von Lutz Röhrich, Goldmann Verlag, München, 1998.
- Jeanne Ruland, Feen, Elfen, Gnome - Das Buch der Naturgeister, Schirner Verlag, Darmstadt, 2010
