= Alvaldi (moon) =

Moon of Saturn

Discovery
- Discovered by: Sheppard et al.
- Discovery date: 2019

Designations
- Pronunciation: /ɔːlˈvɔːldi/
- Named after: Alvaldi
- Alternative names: Saturn LXV; S/2004 S 35; S5801a2

Orbital characteristics
- Semi-major axis: 21953200 km
- Eccentricity: 0.182
- Orbital period (sidereal): −1208.1 days
- Inclination: 176.4°
- Satellite of: Saturn
- Group: Norse group

Physical characteristics
- Mean diameter: 4 km
- Apparent magnitude: 24.6

Alvaldi (Saturn LXV), provisionally known as S/2004 S 35, is a natural satellite of Saturn. Its discovery was announced by Scott S. Sheppard, David C. Jewitt, and Jan Kleyna on October 8, 2019 from observations taken between December 12, 2004 and February 25, 2006. It was given its permanent designation in August 2021. On 24 August 2022, it was officially named after Alvaldi, a jötunn from Norse mythology. He was very rich in gold, and when he died his sons divided his inheritance by taking a mouthful each.

Alvaldi is about 5 kilometres in diameter, and orbits Saturn at an average distance of 22.412 million km in 1253.08 days, at an inclination of 177° to the ecliptic, in a retrograde direction and with an eccentricity of 0.194.
