= Wildmoossee =

Lake in Tyrol, Austria

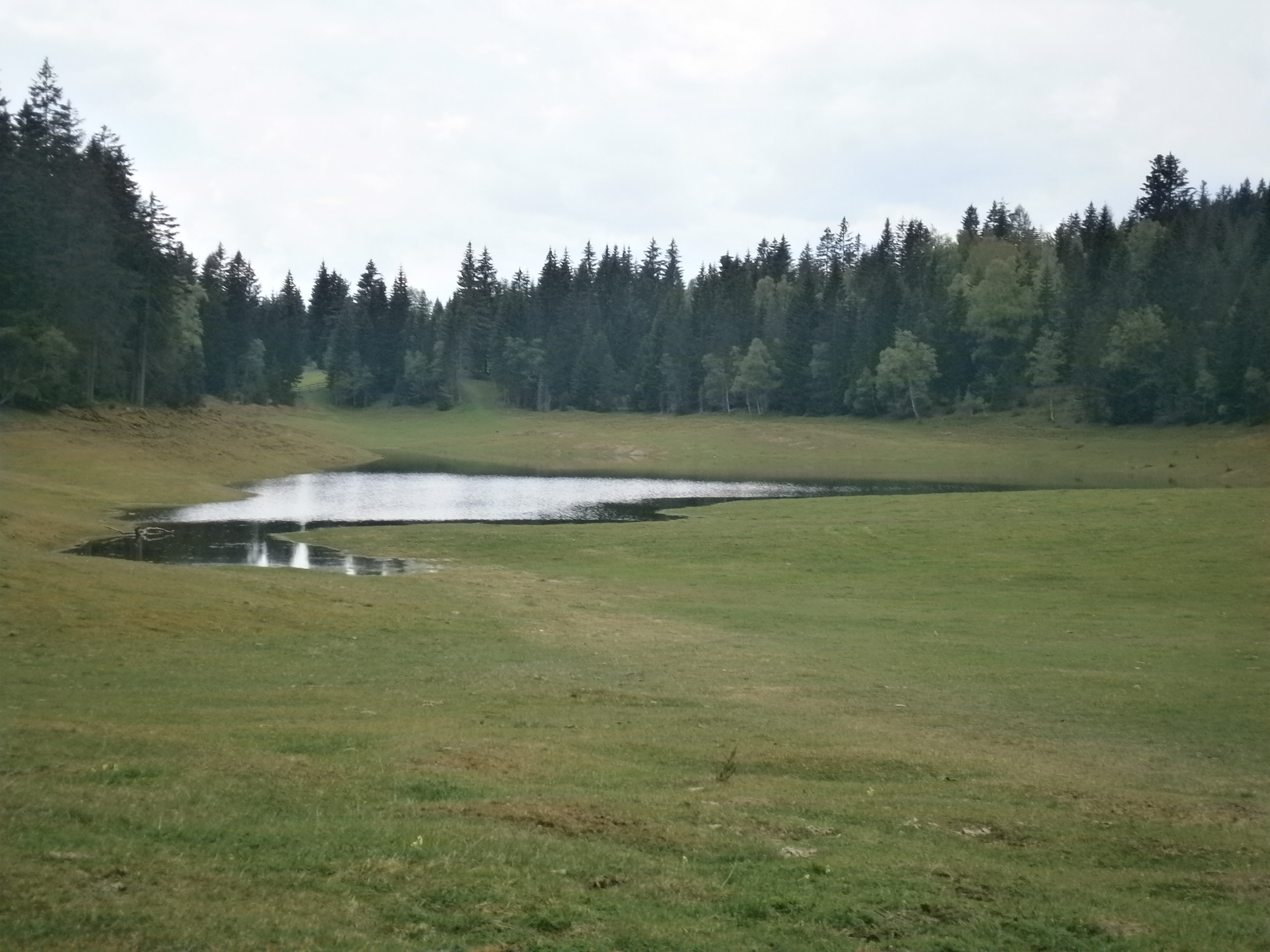
- The Wildmoossee in late spring 2012

- Location within Austria
- Location: Tyrol, Austria
- Coordinates: 47.332962°N 11.144804°E
- Surface elevation: 1,316 m (4,318 ft)

The Wildmoossee is an aperiodic mountain lake, 3 kilometres west of Seefeld in Tirol near the village of Wildmoos in the market borough of Telfs.

The lake lies in the area of the water-soluble main dolomite of the Seefeld Plateau at a height of 1,316 metres. As a result the ground underneath contains chasms that reach up to the bottom of the lake. About every four years, so much groundwater builds up as a result of precipitation and snow meltwater that it is forced upwards out of the chasms under pressure and emerges spring-like at the surface, filling the lake basin. The highest water levels are usually reached in May. In late autumn, the lake empties itself again.

This cycle can change due to the variable level of water resulting from variations in precipitation.

The same karst landscape related phenomenon occurs at the Lottensee lake, 1.5 kilometres to the southwest.

== Literature ==
- Peter Haimayer: Die Fremdenverkehrslandschaft in der Seefelder Senke. Innsbrucker Geographische Studien. Vol. 2. Innsbruck, 1975, p. 139 ff.
