= Þjazi =

Norse mythical character

Iðunn is carried off by Þjazi in this artwork by Harry George Theaker, 1920.

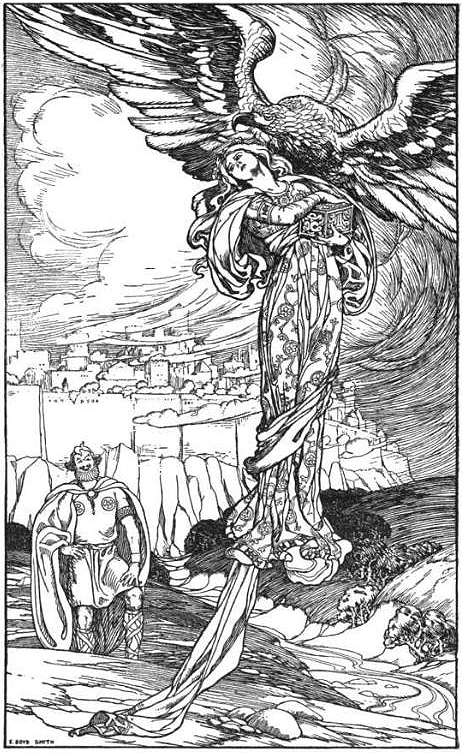
He flapped away with her, magic apples and all (1902) by Elmer Boyd Smith.

In Norse mythology, Þjazi (Old Norse: [ˈθjɑt͡se]; anglicized as Thiazi, Thiazzi, Thjazi, Tjasse or Thiassi) was a jötunn. He was a son of the jötunn Ölvaldi, brother of Iði and Gangr, and the father of Skaði. His most notable misdeed was the kidnapping of the goddess Iðunn, which is related in both the Prose Edda and the skaldic poem Haustlöng.

Saturn's moon Thiazzi was named after him.

== Skáldskaparmál ==
According to Skáldskaparmál, the gods Odin, Loki and Hœnir set out one day on a journey, traveling through mountains and wilderness until they were in need of food. In a valley they saw a herd of oxen, and they took one of the oxen and set it in an earth oven, but after a while they found that it would not cook. As they were trying to determine the reason for this, they heard someone talking in the oak tree above them, saying that he himself was the one responsible for the oven not cooking. They looked up and saw that it was Þjazi in the form of a great eagle, and he told them that if they would let him eat from the ox, then he would make the oven cook. To this they agreed, so he came down from the tree and began devouring a large portion of the meal. He ate so much of it that Loki became angry, grabbed his long staff and attempted to strike him, but the weapon stuck fast to Þjazi's body and he took flight, carrying Loki up with him. As they flew across the land Loki shouted and begged to be let down as his legs banged against trees and stones, but Þjazi would only do so on the condition that Loki must lure Iðunn out of Asgard with her apples of youth, which he solemnly promised to do.

Later, at the agreed time, Loki lured Iðunn out of Asgard into a forest, telling her he had found some apples that she might think worth having, and that she should bring her own apples with her to compare them. Þjazi then appeared in his eagle shape, grabbed Iðunn and flew away with her to his realm of Þrymheimr, located in Jötunheimr.

The gods, deprived of Iðunn's apples, began growing old and grey. When they learned that Iðunn was last seen going out of Asgard with Loki, they threatened him with torture and death until he agreed to rescue her. Loki borrowed a magical coat from Freyja that would allow him to take the shape of a falcon, then flew to Jotunheim until he reached the hall of Þjazi. Finding Iðunn alone while Þjazi was out to sea on a boat, Loki transformed her into a nut and carried her back, flying as fast as he could. When Þjazi returned home and discovered she was gone he assumed his eagle form and flew after Loki. When the gods saw Loki flying toward them with Þjazi right behind they lit a fire which burned Þjazi's feathers, causing him to fall to the ground where he was set upon and killed.

Þjazi's daughter Skaði then put on her war gear and went to Asgard to seek vengeance, but the gods offered her atonement and compensation until she was placated. She was also given the hand of Njörðr in marriage, and as a further reparation Odin took Þjazi's eyes and placed them in the night sky as stars.

Also according to Skáldskaparmál, Þjazi and his brothers Gangr and Idi had a father named Olvaldi. Olvaldi was very rich in gold, and when he died his three sons divided their inheritance between them by each in turn taking a mouthful. For this reason the expressions "speech of Þjazi, Gangr or Idi" and "Idi's shining talk" are kennings for gold, and twice in the same book a kenning is given for Þjazi as "lady wolf", a reference to his abduction of Iðunn. Another is "snowshoe deity's fosterer", or the father of the goddess who goes about on skis.

== Grímnismál ==
In Grímnismál, during Odin's visions of the various dwelling places of gods and jötunn he mentions that of Þjazi in stanza 11:

"Thrymheim the sixth is called
where Þjazi lived, the terrible giant,
but now Skadi, shining bride of the gods,
lives in her father's ancient courts"

== Hárbarðsljóð ==
According to Hárbarðsljóð, it was not Odin but Thor who claimed to have made Þjazi's eyes into stars in stanza 19:

Thor said:

"I killed Þjazi, the powerful minded giant.
I threw up the eyes of Olvaldi's son
into the bright heavens.
They are the greatest sign of my deeds,
those which all men can see afterwards.
What were you doing meanwhile, Harbard?"

== Lokasenna ==
In Lokasenna, it was neither Odin nor Thor but Loki himself who during his verbal sparring with Skadi lays claim to the death of her father in stanza 50:

Loki said:

"You know, if on a sharp rock, with my ice cold son's guts
the gods shall bind me,
first and foremost I was at the killing
when we attacked Þjazi"

== Hyndluljóð ==
According to the interpolated group of stanzas known as the Short Völuspá in Hyndluljóð, Þjazi is further described as "the giant who loved to shoot".

== Hervarar saga ok Heiðreks ==
The U-redaction of Hervarar saga ok Heiðreks includes a section at the start, not included in other manuscripts, which includes a different tale of Þjazi. In this telling, Odin's son Sigrlami, king of Gardariki, was killed in battle with Þjazi. After this, Sigrlami's son Svafrlami had the magic sword Tyrfing from Dvalinn and Durinn. He used the sword to kill Þjazi. Then Svafrlami married Þjazi's daughter Frid, and had a daughter Eyfura.

== Familiar forms ==
- Þjazi, anglicized as

- Thiazi
- Thjazi
- Thiassi

- Tjatse (mainland Scandinavian)
- Tjasse (Norse)

Scholars have debated whether Þjazi can be identified with the Vedic god Tvashtr.

== Gallery ==
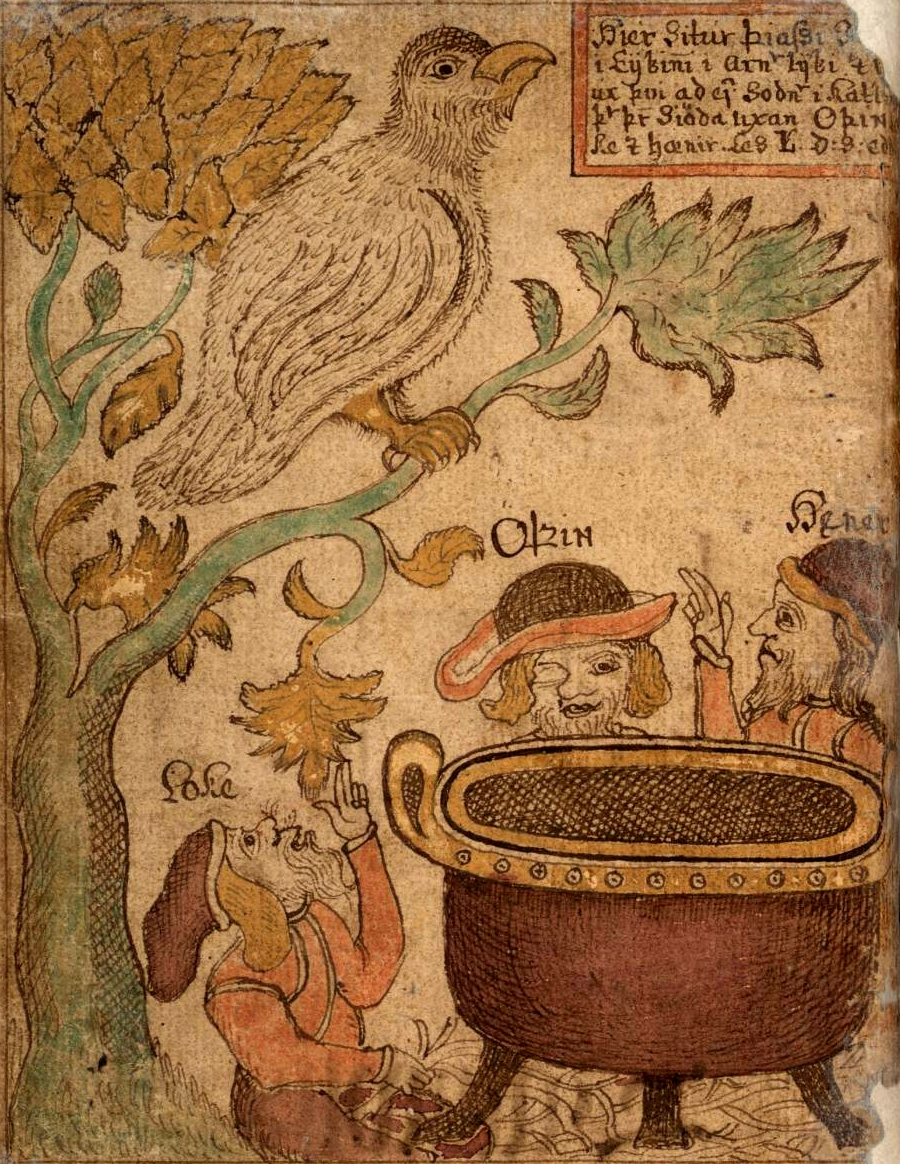
Þjazi stops the Æsir from boiling food in this illustration from an 18th-century Icelandic manuscript.

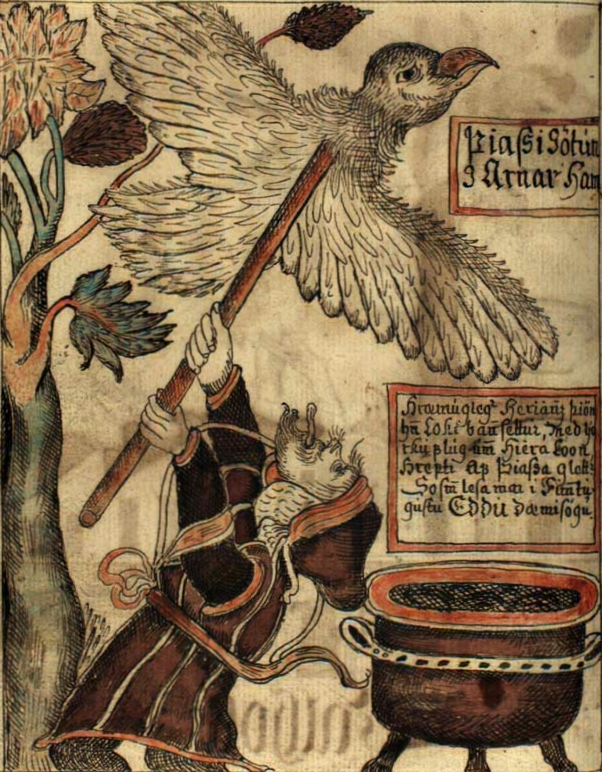
Another depiction of Þjazi as an eagle, carrying away Loki.

== See also ==
- Tjasse Glacier
