= Gangr =

Norse mythical character

Gangr (or Gang; Old Norse: [ˈɡɑŋɡz̠], 'traveller') is a jötunn in Norse mythology. He is portrayed as the son of Alvaldi and the brother of Þjazi and Iði.

== Name ==
The Old Norse name Gangr has been translated as 'traveller'. It is related to the Icelandic gangur and the Norwegian gang ('walking, hallway, corridor'), all stemming from Proto-Germanic *gangaz ('walking, going, way'; compare with Gothic gagg 'street, road', and with Old English and Old High German gang 'going, journey, way').

== Attestation ==
In Skáldskaparmál (Language of Poetry), Gangr is mentioned as the son of the jötunn Alvaldi, who is "very rich in gold", and as the brother of Þjazi and Iði.

Then spoke Ægir: ‘Thiassi seems to me to have been very powerful, what was his origin?’
Bragi replied: ‘His father was called Olvaldi, and you will find what I have to say about him remarkable. He was very rich in gold, and when he died and his sons had to divide their inheritance, they measured out the gold when they divided it by each in turn taking a mouthful, all of them the same number. One of them was Thiassi, the second Idi, the third Gang. And we now have this expression among us, to call gold the mouth-tale of these giants, and we conceal it in secret language or in poetry by calling it speech or words or talk of these giants.’

— Skáldskaparmál, 56–57, trans. A. Faulkes, 2002.
