= Syrbotae =

The Syrbotae, a species of giant mentioned in many medieval bestiaries, were said to live in Africa and stand about eight cubits tall (a cubit is the distance from a man's elbow to the tip of his middle finger).

Source: Pliny the Elder, Pliny's Natural History, Volumes 1–3, 160; Weber, Process of the seuyn Seuyn Sages, 327.
