= Fjölvar =

Figure in Norse mythology

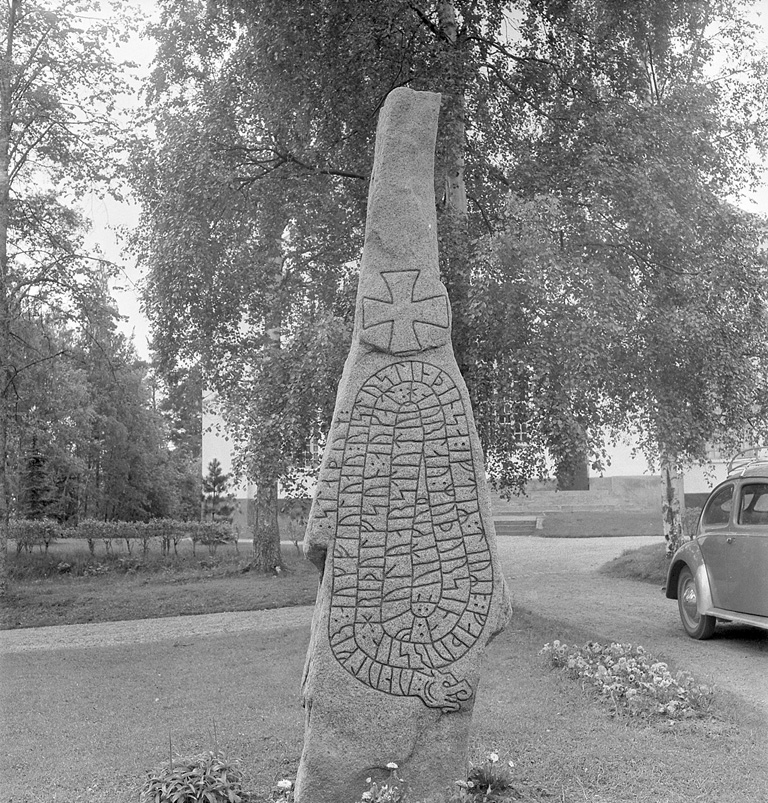
Runestone Hs 6 at Järvsö in Hälsingland, Sweden, which records a historical bearer of the name Fjolvar.

Fjölvar (Old Norse: Fjǫlvarr) is a figure in Norse mythology, possibly a jötunn, with whom Odin — in disguise as Hárbarðr — claims to have spent five winters fighting and pursuing women on the island of Algrœn ("All-green"). He is attested only once, in the Poetic Edda poem Hárbarðsljóð.

== Etymology ==
The name Fjǫlvarr is an Old Norse masculine personal name, normalized in modern scholarship as Fjölvar.

Linguistically it is generally analysed as a compound of two elements:

- fjǫl- — "much, many, manifold; exceedingly, very", from Proto-Germanic *felu-. Compare Gothic filu, Old English fela, Old High German filu.
- -varr — most often connected with Old Norse varr "attentive, wary, cautious, aware, wise", varinn "watchful, careful", and verja "to defend, protect". The same base appears in Proto-Germanic *wara- "alert, wary" and *warjaz "defender, protector". In some name-combinations -varr may alternatively continue -hari ("warrior", variant of HER) where the v originally belongs to the first element.

Together the compound was also used in Old Norse as a common adjective fjǫlvarr meaning "very wary, very cautious".

The feminine counterpart Fjǫlvǫr is listed among gýgjar and troll-wives in the Nafnaþulur section of the Prose Edda. The masculine -varr ~ feminine -vǫr pairing follows the regular gendered variation for this name element, whose female equivalent is listed as VÖR.

Modern English editions render Old Norse Fjǫlvarr variously as Fjolvar and Fjölvar.

== Attestation ==
=== Hárbarðsljóð ===
Fjölvar is attested only once in surviving Old Norse poetry, in stanza 17 (numbered 16–18 in some editions) of Hárbarðsljóð ("The Lay of Hárbarðr"), a flyting between Thor and Hárbarðr (Odin in disguise as a ferryman). The poem is preserved complete in the Codex Regius and in part in the Codex AM 748 I 4to, and is usually dated in its present form to the 11th–13th century as part of the Poetic Edda.

In the exchange, Hárbarðr (Odin) boasts of his stay with Fjölvar:

I [Odin] was with Fjölvar all of five winters [five years],
In that island, which is called Algrœn [All-green];
We could fight and fell carrion,
To test much, to try our luck with a maiden.

— Hárbarðsljóð, st. 17, trans. J. Lindow, 2002.

Thor asks how they fared with women, and Odin continues in the following stanza (18) that he alone slept by seven sisters on Algrœn and had "joy full great" from each. The episode is recounted by Odin himself as part of his boastful speech while travelling in disguise.

The island name Algrœn is usually rendered "All-green". No other surviving source recounts the five winters with Fjölvar, the battles, or the seven sisters, leaving the allusion without known parallel.

=== Runestone Hs 6 ===
The name Fjolvar is also attested as a human personal name on the Viking Age runestone Hs 6 at Järvsö church in Hälsingland, Sweden. The inscription records that "Unnulfr and Fjolvar raised this stone after Djuri, his father, Redulfr's son, and after Harlau, his mother, Fjolvar's daughter at Viksta." This is a separate, historical use of the same Old Norse personal name and does not refer to the mythological figure, but illustrates that the name was in contemporary use as documented in the runic name lexicon.

== Theories ==
According to scholar John Lindow, since the þulur lists Fjǫlvǫr among the jötnar (giantesses / troll-wives), it is likely that Fjölvar would have been her male counterpart, and therefore also a jötunn.

Because Fjölvar appears only once, and the Hárbarðsljóð passage gives no genealogy, dwelling, or physical description beyond companionship with Odin in battle and love-adventure on Algrœn, his nature, status, and relationship to Odin remain uncertain and dependent on this etymological pairing.
