= William of Lindholme =

Legendary figure in English folklore

William of Lindholme (or William de Lindholme) is a legendary figure in English folklore, who lived in a hermitage on an island (an area now called Lindholme) in the middle of the Hatfield Chase, today located in the Metropolitan Borough of Doncaster. Many differing tales were told about William, from him being born a Giant, to him being either a Satanic Magician or a Righteous Monk. What can be extracted is that William was a real hermit, living in the Lindholme waste, likely where the Rangjung Yeshe Gomde Tibetan Buddhist Centre now stands.

== Reports ==
The earliest report of William comes from the will of John Symson of Fish Lake, dated to March 23, 1407, in which he bequeaths 7 pence to the hermit of Lindholme.

According to the Yorkshire Archaeological Journal, the MSS of Dr. Nathaniel Johnston, which number over 100 volumes, contain information and references to the occupant of the hermitage at Lindholme.

The diary of Rev. Abraham De La Pryme contains the following section about William:

July 28, 1697

Having been in Yorkshire this last week, I met with diverse learned and ingenious gentlemen, who told me a great many observable things.

It was upon Hanson’s house at Hale’s Hill, Woodhouse, that St. William a’ Lindholme set his wagon. One Hanson lived there then. Look and see when the Hansons lived, and you may find perhaps when William a’ Lindholme lived.

Investigative research done by William Brockhurst Stonehouse, published in his 1839 book "The History and Topography of the Isle of Axholme", uncovered that the burial stone of William of Lindholme was no longer there, however his burial place was still at that time visible, with the stone having been broken down and used as cobblestone by a previous owner of the land. The burial stone was described by Antiquarian George Stovin, whom, according to an August 31, 1727 letter printed in the Gentleman's Magazine, exhumed William's body, he stated that the stone was 8½ feet in length, 3 feet in breadth and 8 feet in thickness. He also described an altar on the opposite side of the island made of hewn stone.

He also stated that upon exhuming his body they uncovered a skull, tooth and hip bone from a very large human, as well as the remains of a bag of hemp seed and a large beaten copper plate with two chevrons on it.

He is held to have thrown the "thumb stone" and "little-finger stone" from Lindholme to Wroot, some three miles distant.
