= Tyrolean shale oil =

Tyrolean shale oil is a black, strong-smelling oil found in the stones of Karwendel Mountains, a mountain range of the Northern Limestone Alps in Austria and Germany.

It is also known as Ichthyol. According to legend, it is the blood of the giant Thyrsus; hence, it is also called Thyrsenblut or Dirschenblut. From the "Thyrsenblut" the healing Tyrolean shale oil is extracted. Shale oil reserves are located in the oil shale at Seefeld in Bächen Valley plate and close to Achen Lake. The oil-bearing zones lie at an angle of 51 degrees.

== History ==
The oil shale deposits in Tyrol in Seefeld area were used from 1350 until 1964. In 1902, Martin Albrecht, a collector of minerals, discovered oil shale deposits on the shore of Lake Achen at Pertisau; his family still exploits and markets the oil.

Tyrolean shale oil has always been an integral part of Tyrolean medicine. The shale oil contains bound sulfur, which exerts its effect in shale oil. Long before the oil refinery, the oil of the Alps, the "black gold", was already used for tar, light oil (naphtha), impregnation of wood fences, as waterproofing for roofs and asphalt roads.

Due to the low yield, the oil shale processing was finally reduced to the medical and cosmetic applications.

== Bibliography ==
- Michael Unterwurzacher (Ed.), Im Reich des Patscherkofel: Sagen und Fakten rund um Innsbrucks Hausberg und das Südöstliche Mittelgebirge, Books on Demand, 2009
- Michael Forcher, Der Riese Haymon, Haymon Verlag, Innsbruck, 2007
