= Iði =

Norse mythical character

Iði (Old Norse: [ˈiðe]; also Idi) is a jötunn in Norse mythology. He is the son of Alvaldi and the brother of Þjazi and Gangr.

== Name ==
The Old Norse name Iði has been translated as the 'active one' or the 'hard-working one', deriving from ið ('work'; compare with Norwegian idig and Swedish idog 'hard-working').

== Attestations ==
In Skáldskaparmál (Language of Poetry), Iði is mentioned as the son of the jötunn Alvaldi, who is "very rich in gold", and as the brother of Þjazi and Gangr:

Then spoke Ægir: ‘Thiassi seems to me to have been very powerful, what was his origin?’
Bragi replied: ‘His father was called Olvaldi, and you will find what I have to say about him remarkable. He was very rich in gold, and when he died and his sons had to divide their inheritance, they measured out the gold when they divided it by each in turn taking a mouthful, all of them the same number. One of them was Thiassi, the second Idi, the third Gang. And we now have this expression among us, to call gold the mouth-tale of these giants, and we conceal it in secret language or in poetry by calling it speech or words or talk of these giants.’

— Skáldskaparmál, 56–57, trans. A. Faulkes, 2002.
