= Thyrsus (giant) =

Mythical figure from Tyrol

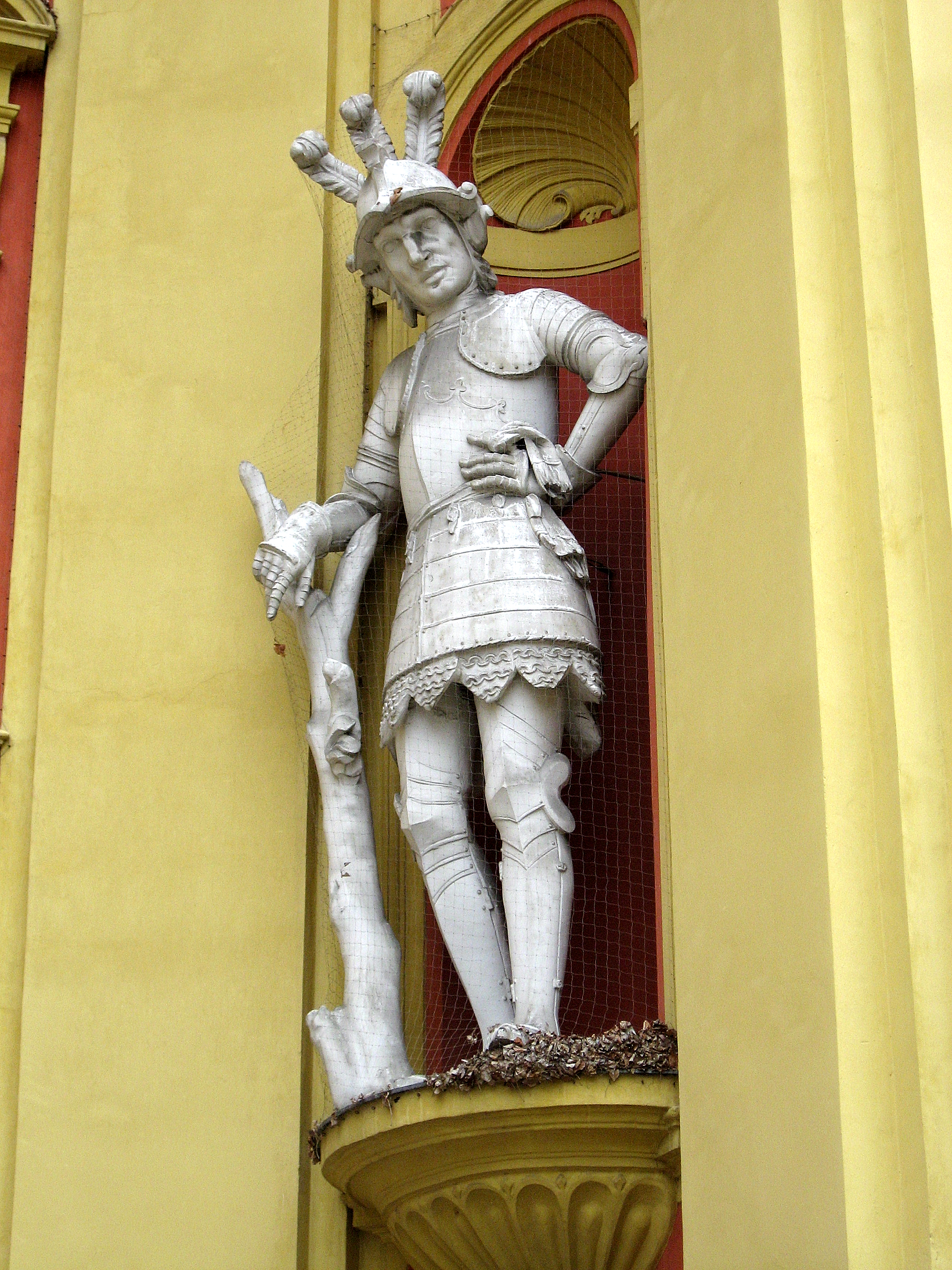
Figure of the giant over a church in Innsbruck

The giant Thyrsus is a mythical figure from Tyrol. He is said to have lived in Leithen close to Reith.

Thyrsus is mentioned in the legend of the giant Haymon. According to tradition, Thyrsus was stronger, more dexterous and half a head taller than Haymon.

== Background ==
In the Germanic mythology, Thürse, Thürsus, and Thurse are names for prehistoric giants. The hrimthurs, who are made of frost and ice, are descendants of the world's giant Ymir. In the legend of the giant Haymon, however, Thyrsus is a proper name.

== Tradition ==
The cause of the dispute between the two giants Haymon and Thyrsus is reported differently: One tradition tells that Thyrsus felt provoked by the immigrating Haymon ("Rheinländer" which means man from the river Rhine), because Thyrsus had already lived for ages in the Upper Inn Valley.

Another tradition reports of a sudden destruction of Haymon's castle during one night. Whilst one reported variant provides no reason for the sudden destruction, another variant says that it was Haymon's human neighbors who destroyed his castle. Then, they knowingly accused Thyrsus to be the perpetrator.

The fight between the two giants was reported to have taken place close to the hamlet Thyrschenbach - today: Dirschenbach. During the fight, Haymon stabbed a deep wound into Thyrsus' heel with his sword, so that a fountain of bright blood poured out. Thyrsus took a turf, stuffed it into the wound, and fled into Karwendel. The many blood, which he had lost, leaked into the rocks. Haymon followed him and reached him close to the hill Leitner Kogel. There Haymon slew Thyrsus. The last words of the giant Thyrsus should have been: "Blood spray! Be good for man and beast! (Spritz Bluet! Sei für Viech und Menschen gut!“)"

Only long time later, local farmers found the healing Thyrsusblut - named Dirschenblut - in the rocks of the Karwendel mountains (cf. Tyrolean Shale Oil).

== Miscellaneous ==
At the time of plague, Thyrsus once fell ill. In order not to infect the rest of the villagers, he retreated into the cellar of his house. Thus his village was spared from the plague.

The house vis-à-vis the Chapel of the Holy Saint Magnus in Reith (almost Leithen) is said to be Thyrsus' house.

== Books ==
- Michael Unterwurzacher (Ed.), Im Reich des Patscherkofel: Sagen und Fakten rund um Innsbrucks Hausberg und das Südöstliche Mittelgebirge, Books on Demand, 2009
- Michael Forcher, Der Riese Haymon, Haymon Verlag, Innsbruck, 2007
- Wolfgang Morscher, Berit Mrugalska-Morscher, Die schönsten Sagen aus Tirol, Haymon Verlag, Innsbruck, 2010
