= Alvaldi =

Norse mythical character

Alvaldi (also Ölvaldi; Old Norse 'all-powerful') is a jötunn in Norse mythology, presented as the father of Þjazi. Saturn's moon Alvaldi is named after him.

== Name ==
The Old Norse name Alvadi means 'all-powerful'. The name Ölvadi, found in Skáldskaparmál, appears to be a variant form referring to the same character.

== Attestations ==
In Hárbarðsljóð (Lay of Hárbarðr), Alvadi is mentioned as the father of the jötunn Þjazi.

In Skáldskaparmál (Language of Poetry), he is named Ölvadi and portrayed as the father of Þjazi, Gangr and Iði. Described as "very rich in gold", Ölvadi divides the inheritance among his sons in such a way that each may take the same mouthful of gold. According to philologist Rudolf Simek, the story is probably the remnant of an old myth.

Then spoke Ægir: ‘Thiassi seems to me to have been very powerful, what was his origin?’
Bragi replied: ‘His father was called Olvaldi, and you will find what I have to say about him remarkable. He was very rich in gold, and when he died and his sons had to divide their inheritance, they measured out the gold when they divided it by each in turn taking a mouthful, all of them the same number. One of them was Thiassi, the second Idi, the third Gang. And we now have this expression among us, to call gold the mouth-tale of these giants, and we conceal it in secret language or in poetry by calling it speech or words or talk of these giants.’

— Skáldskaparmál, 56–57, trans. A. Faulkes, 1987.
