= Gunnlod (moon) =

Moon of Saturn

Discovery
- Discovered by: Sheppard et al.
- Discovery date: 2019

Designations
- Pronunciation: /ˈɡʊnlɒð/
- Named after: Gunnlǫð
- Alternative names: Saturn LXII; S/2004 S 32; S64472

Orbital characteristics
- Semi-major axis: 21564200 km
- Eccentricity: 0.262
- Orbital period (sidereal): −1175.3 days
- Inclination: 158.5°
- Satellite of: Saturn
- Group: Norse group

Physical characteristics
- Mean diameter: 4 km
- Apparent magnitude: 25.0

Gunnlod (Saturn LXII), provisionally known as S/2004 S 32, is a natural satellite of Saturn. Its discovery was announced by Scott S. Sheppard, David C. Jewitt, and Jan Kleyna on October 8, 2019 from observations taken between December 12, 2004 and January 19, 2007. It was given its permanent designation in August 2021.

On 24 August 2022, it was officially named after Gunnlǫð, a jötunn from Norse mythology. She is the daughter of Suttungr and guarded the mead of poetry for him. But Odin in the form of a snake gained access to the chamber in Hnitbjorg where the mead was kept, seduced Gunnlǫð, and slept with her for three nights. In return Gunnlǫð allowed Odin three drinks of the mead, and he then immediately flew out of the cavern in the form of an eagle.

Gunnlod is about 4 kilometres in diameter, and orbits Saturn at an average distance of 21.214 million km in 1153.96 days, at an inclination of 159° to the ecliptic, in a retrograde direction and with an eccentricity of 0.251.
