= Fjalar and Galar =

Norse mythical characters

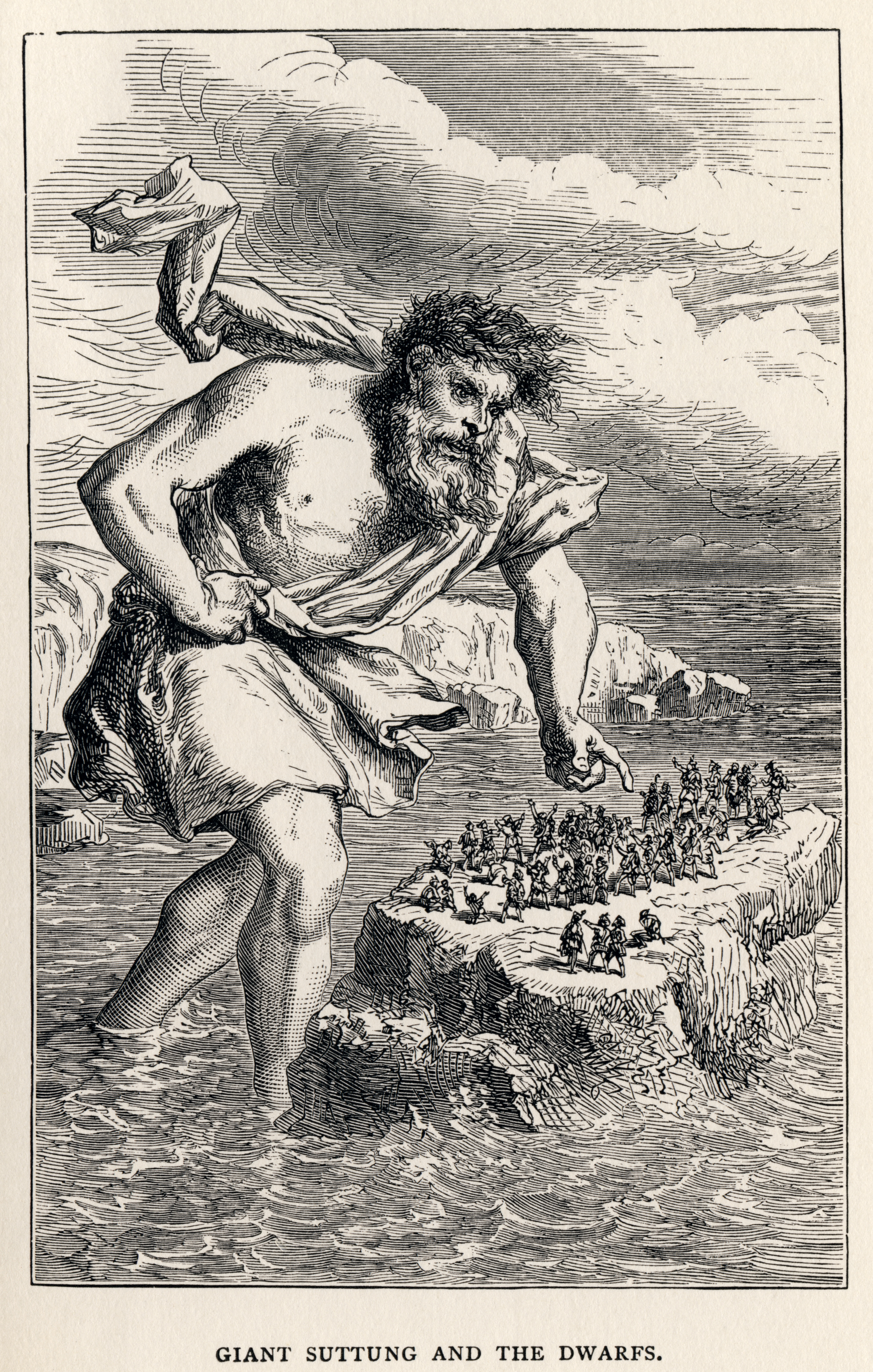
Giant Suttung and the dwarfs by Louis Huard. Suttungr put the dwarves on a rock about to be submerged, at which point they bargained for their life by offering him the mead of poetry.

In Nordic mythology, Fjalar (Old Norse: Fjalarr [ˈfjɑlɑrː]) and his brother Galar (Old Norse: Galarr [ˈɡɑlɑrː]), were wicked dwarfs who killed Kvasir and turned his blood into the mead of poetry, which inspired poets. They appear in Skáldskaparmál.

== Myth ==
Fjalar and Galar murdered a jötunn named Gilling, along with his wife. Their son, Suttungr, searched for his parents and threatened the dwarven brothers, who offered him the magical mead in exchange for sparing their lives. Suttungr took it and hid it in the center of a mountain, with his daughter, Gunnlöð, standing guard.

Odin eventually decided to obtain the mead. He worked for Baugi, Suttungr's brother, for an entire summer, then asked for a small sip of the mead. Baugi drilled into the mountain, whereupon Odin changed into a snake and slithered inside. Inside, Gunnlöð was guarding the mead, but he seduced her and persuaded her to give him three sips; Odin proceeded to drink all the mead, change into an eagle and escape.

== Sources ==
- Snorri Sturluson, Edda, translated and edited by Anthony Faulkes, London: Everyman, 1995, ISBN 0-460-87616-3.
