= Rati (Norse mythology) =

Drill or auger from Norse mythology

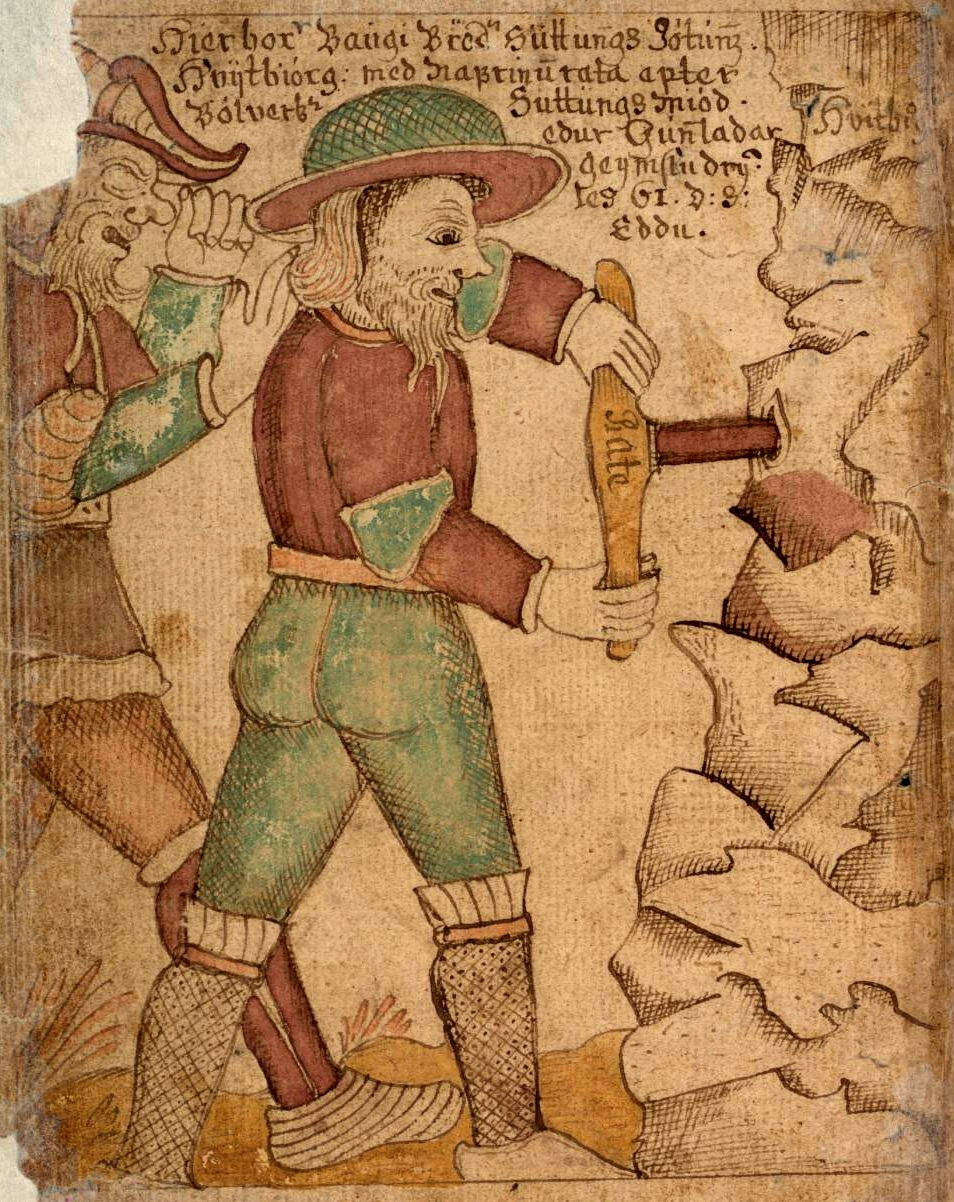
18th century Icelandic depiction of Rati

In Norse mythology, Rati is the name of a drill or auger that was used by Odin during his quest to obtain the mead of poetry from the giant Suttung with the help of Suttung's brother Baugi. According to the Skáldskaparmál section of the Prose Edda, Odin instructed Baugi to bore a hole with the auger through the mountain Hnitbjorg where the mead was kept. When Baugi told him that the hole had been drilled, Odin blew into the hole and the stone bits blew back at him. In this way he realized that Baugi had not drilled all the way through and was trying to trick him. Odin told him to drill a second time, and this time when he blew into the hole the bits flew inward. Odin then transformed himself into a snake, and when he slithered into the hole Baugi tried to stab him with the auger but missed him. In this manner Odin gained access to the mead.
