= Feather cloak =

Type of cloak

Feather cloaks have been used by several cultures. It constituted noble and royal attire in § Hawaii and other Polynesian regions. It is a mythical bird-skin object that imparts power of flight upon the Gods in § Germanic mythology and legend, including the § Swan maidens account. In medieval Ireland, the chief poet (filí or ollam) was entitled to wear a feather cloak.

The feather robe or cloak (Chinese: yuyi; Japanese: hagoromo; 羽衣) was considered the clothing of the Immortals (xian; 仙/僊), and features in swan maiden tale types where a tennyo (Japanese: 天女 "heavenly woman") robbed of her clothing or "feather robe" and becomes bound to live on mortal earth. However, the so-called "feather robe" of the Chinese and Japanese celestial woman came to be regarded as silk clothing or scarves around the shoulder in subsequent literature and iconography.

== Hawaii ==
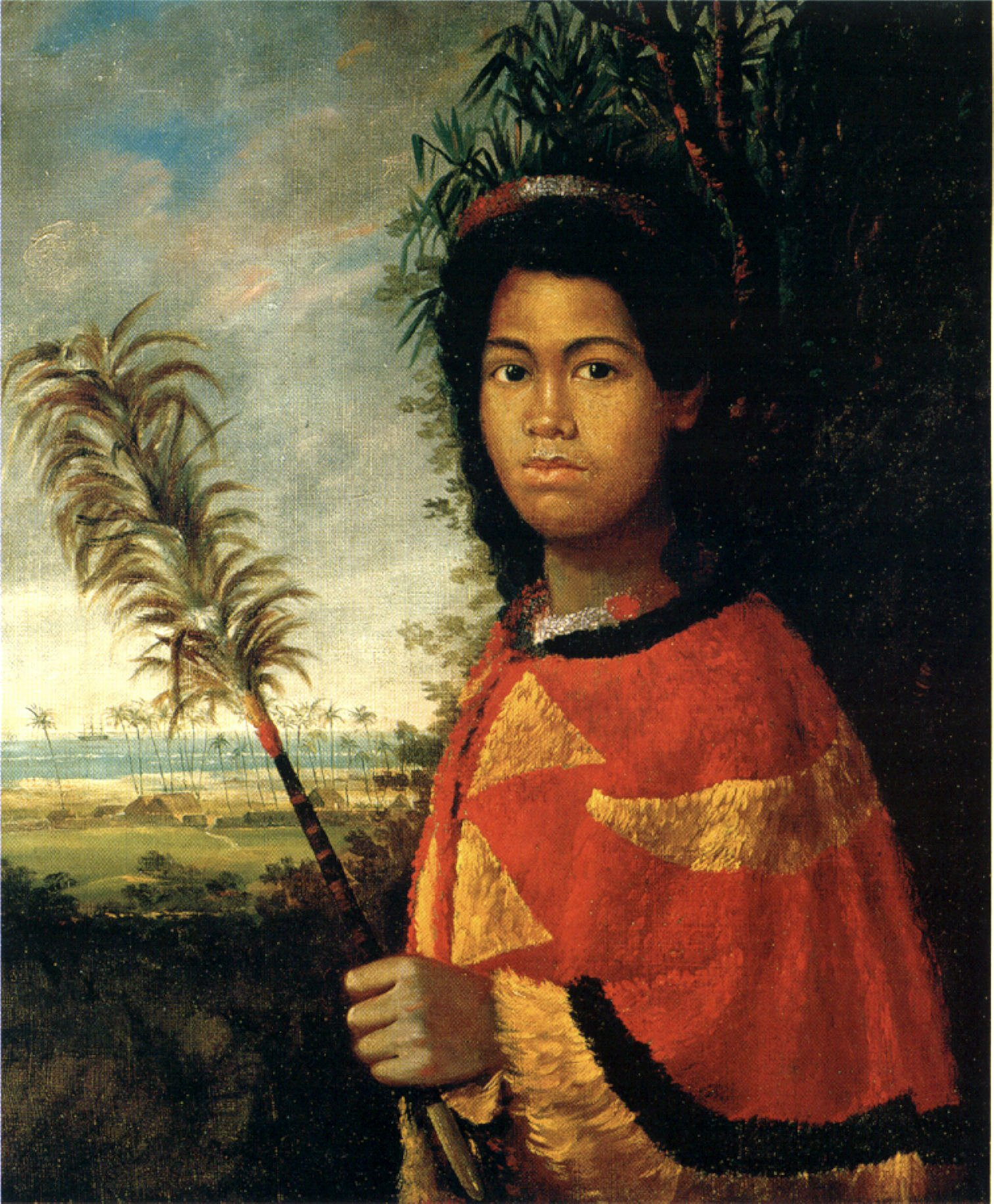
Princess Nāhiʻenaʻena in her cloak while using a kāhili.
—Robert Dampier, 1825

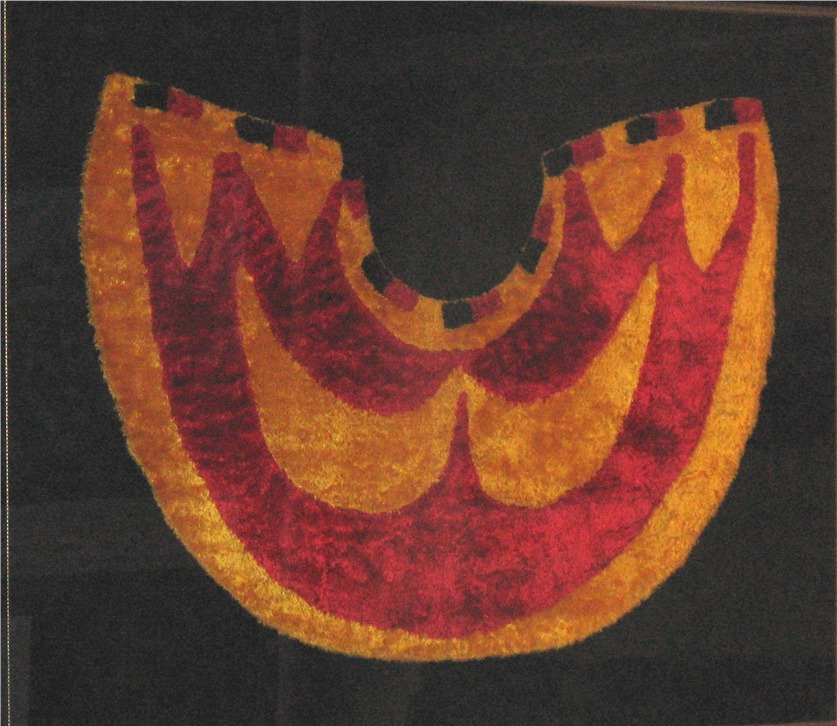
Feather cape (Note: Cf. overall similarity in design to Bishop Museum piece catalogued C.9558)
—Display at Keauhou, Hawaii

Elaborate feather cloaks called ʻahu ʻula were created by early Hawaiians, and usually reserved for the use of high chiefs and aliʻi (royalty).

The scarlet honeycreeper ʻiʻiwi (Vestiaria coccinea) was the main source of red feathers. Yellow feathers were collected in small amounts each time from the mostly black ʻōʻō (Moho spp.) or the mamo (Drepanis pacifica). (Note: The mamo feathers were yellow tinged with orange or even called "rich orange" compared with the ʻōʻō feathers which were "bright yellow". And the mamo was forbidden use except by a king of an entire island.)

Another strictly regal item was the kāhili, a symbolic "staff of state" or standard, consisting of pole with plumage attached to the top of it. (Note: Although the kāhili was strictly for the aliʻi there was a kāhili bearer appointed to hold it, and it was waved over the royal during sleep, as a fly-brush or fly-whisk. Contrary to the one-handed version in the princess's painting, the multi-colored kāhili held by her bearer may be 30 feet long.) Princess Nāhiʻenaʻena in her portrait (cf. fig. right) is depicted holding a kāhili while wearing a feather cloak. She would typically wear a feather cloak with a feather coronet and she would match these with a pair of pāʻū ('skirts') which ordinarily would be barkcloth skirt, however, she also had a magnificent yellow feather skirt made for her, which featured in her funerary services. (Note: Incidentally, a tertiary meaning of pāʻū is that it signifies the red feathers around the yellow in an ornamental feather bundle, called ʻuo.)

Other famous examples include:

- Kamehameha's feather cloak - made entirely of the golden-yellow feather of the mamo, inherited by Kamehameha I. King Kalākaua displayed this artefact to emphasize his own legitimate authority.
- Kiwalao's feather cloak - King Kīwalaʻō's cloak, captured by half-brother Kamehameha I who slew him in 1782. It symbolized leadership and was worn by chieftains during times of war.
- Liloa's kāʻei - sash of King Līloa of the island of Hawaii

=== Hawaiian mythology ===
A mythical enemy-incinerating kapa (barkcloth) cape, retold as a feather skirt in one telling, occurs in Hawaiian mythology. In the tradition regarding the hero ʻAukelenuiaʻīkū. (Note: Of which there are nine version according to Brown (2022).) The hero's grandmother Moʻoinanea, who is the matriarch of divine lizards (moʻo akua, or simply moʻo), gives him her severed tail which transforms into a cape (or kapa lehu, i.e. tapa) that turns enemies into ashes, and sends him off on a quest to woo his destined wife, Nāmaka. Nāmaka (who is predicted to attack him when he visits) will be immune to the cape's powers. She is also a granddaughter or descendant of the lizard, and has been given the lizard's battle pāʻū (skirt) and kāhili (feathered staff), also conferred with power to destroy enemy into ashes. In one retelling, Moʻoinanea (Ka-moʻo-inanea) gives her grandson ʻAukele her "feather skirt" and kāhili which "by shaking.. can reduce his enemies to ashes".

A commentator has argued that the feather garment of Nāhiʻenaʻena was regarded as imbued with the apotropaic "powers of a woman's genitals", reminiscent of the mythic pāʻū which Hiʻiaka was given by Pele. (Note: Charlot 1991, p. 137, cited by Brown.)

== Māori ==
It has been noted there is a pan-Polynesian culture of valuing the use of feathers in garments, especially of red colour, and there had even existed ancient trade in feathers. While various featherwork apparel were widespread across Polynesia, feather capes were limited to Hawaiʻi and New Zealand.

The Māori feather cloak or kahu huruhuru are known for their rectangular-shaped examples. (Note: Whereas the Hawaiian feather cape developed from rectangular to circular shape, as aforementioned) The most prized were the red feathers which in Māori culture signified chiefly rank, and were taken from the kākā parrot to make the kahu kura which literally means 'red cape'. (Note: Though the kahu kura was literally 'red cape' it was understood to signify a cape made from the feathers of the kaka parrot. Māori kahu kura may be cognate with Hawaiian ʻahu ʻula, since the latter will result from dropping the k. Though not the kaka parrot, Hiroa elsewhere states that koko is an olden name for the tui bird, and he also suggests dropping the k yields Hawaiian ʻōʻō, a source of yellow feathers there.)

The feather garment continues to be utilized as symbolic of rank or respect.

== Brazil ==
The feather cloak or cape was traditional to the coastal Tupi people, notably the Tupinambá. The cape was called guará-abucu (var. gûaráabuku) in Tupi–Guarani, so called from the red plumage of guará (Eudocimus ruber, scarlet ibis) and not only did it have a hood at the top, but it was meant to cover the body to simulate becoming a bird, and even included a buttocks piece called enduaps. These feather capes were worn by Tupian shamans or pajé (var. paîé) during rituals, and clearly held religious or sacred meaning. The cape was also worn in battle, but it has been clarified that the warrior as well as his victim were deliberately dressed as birds as executioners and the offering in ritual sacrifices.

== Germanic ==
A bird-hamr (pl. hamir) or feather cloak that enables the wearers to take the form of, or become, birds are widespread in Germanic mythology and legend. The goddess Freyja was known for her "feathered or falcon cloak" (fjaðrhamr, valshamr), which could be borrowed by others to use, and the jötunn Þjazi may have had something similar, referred to as an arnarhamr (eagle-shape or coat). (Note: In the narrative, Þjazi appears "in eagle form" (Old Norse: í arnarhami) at the meal (and in the woods), but when he goes in pursuit, he "wears an eagle coat" (Old Norse: tekr an arnarhamin.)

The term hamr has the dual meaning of "skin" or "shape", and in this context, fjaðrhamr has been translated variously as "feather-skin", (Note: arnar-hamr: giant in "eagle's skin; vals-hamr", a falcon's skin.) "feather-fell", "feather-cloak", "feather coat", "feather-dress", "coat of feathers", or form, shape or guise. (Note: The Cleasby-Vigufsson definition of fjaðr-hamr as "'feather ham' or winged haunch.." is avoided by the aforementioned translators and commentators; Haymes's translation The Saga of Thidrek being an exception.) (Note: To complicate matters, despite the choice of wording ("cloak", the primary sense), the intended meaning may be opposite. Thus Larrington's translation "Thrym's Poem" renders the term as "feather cloak", but in endnote explains this is meant as "attribute" of flying capability. And vice versa: Morris says "shape" but in the next breath describes as "such a costume")

The topic is often discussed in the broader sense of "ability to fly", inclusive of Óðinn's ability to transform into bird shape, and Wayland's (Note: Völundr in the Eddic lay, but Velent in Þiðreks saga.) flying contraption. This wider categorization is necessitated due to ambiguity: in the case of Óðinn (and Suttungr) resorting to the arnarhamr ("eagle cloak"), it is unclear whether this should be construed literally to mean the use of a garment, or be taken metaphorically as shape-shifting (e.g. "changed into eagle-shape"), (Note: Even though the double instances of arnarhamr were translated early by Vigfusson and Powell (1882) as Odin's "eagle's coat" and Suttung's "eagle-skin", later translators (Brodeur 1916, Young 1954) render them as "shape", etc. etc.) perhaps by use of magic. (Note: Note that the same verb (brásk, preterite of bregða is used by the Snorra Edda to describe Odin's transformation into the serpent's likeness, so by being consistent in the rendering of the same verb, Vigfusson & Powell produced the (awkward) translation "turned into the eagle's coat". Ruggerini argues that the verb taka "to wear" is not used, and the bregða i meaning changing appearance into something else, suggests use of black magic like seiðr.) Also, Völundr's "wing" is not a "feather cloak" per se, but only likened to it (cf. § Wayland).

=== Gods and jötnar ===
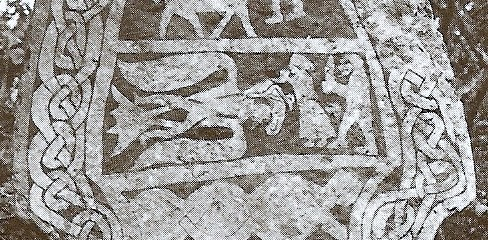
Gotlandic image stone believed to depict Odin in the form of an eagle (note the eagle's beard), Gunnlöð holding the Mead of Poetry, and Suttungr. ―Stora Hammars III

In Norse mythology, goddesses Freyja (as aforementioned) and Frigg each own a feather cloak that imparts the ability of flight.

Freyja is not attested as using the cloak herself, however she lent her fjaðrhamr ("feather cloak") to Loki so he could fly to Jötunheimr after Þórr's hammer went missing in Þrymskviða, (Note: Þrymskviða 3,6; 5,2; 9,2. Finnur Jónsson ed. (1905),^{1905} Vigfusson & Powell ed. with prose tr. (1883) Orchard tr. (2011)) and to rescue Iðunn from the jötunn Þjazi in Skáldskaparmál who had abducted the goddess while in an arnarhamr ("eagle shape"). (Note: Snorra Edda, Skaldskaparmál G1, G56. In the 1848 edition, this belongs in the section "Bragi's sayings" 56, prior to Skáldskaparmál, but Faulkes tr. 1995 places it near the beginning of Skáldskaparmál marked as section "[56]" at pp. 59–60. Cf. also Byock (2005),) The latter episode is also attested in the poem Haustlöng, where Freyja's garment is referred to as hauks flugbjalfa "hawk's flying-fur", or "hawk's flight-skin" (Note: Or hauks bjalfi "hawk's skin") and the jötunn employs a gemlishamr "cloak/shape of eagle".

Loki also uses Frigg's feather cloak to journey to Geirröðargarða ("Geirröðr's courts" (Note: Skaldskaparmál 18, "..Þórr fór til Geirröðargarða", "how Thor went to Geirrod's courts" (Faulkes tr. 1995, p. 80).) in Jötunheimr (Note: "Jötunheimr" ("Giantland") is not explicit in text, but the Þórsdrápa here quoted periphrases Þórr's destination as "ymsa kindar iðja" which has been translated as "seat of Ymir's kin [Giantland]" (Faulkes tr. 1995, p. 83). As the story goes, Loki in falcoln form was captured, and is compelled to bring Þórr to Geirröðr.)), referred to here as a valshamr ("falcon-feathered cloak"). (Note: Skaldskaparmál G18. Translations by Faulkes (1995) and Thorpe (1851).)

Óðinn is described as being able to change his shape into that of animals, as attested in the Ynglinga saga. Furthermore, in the story of the Mead of Poetry from Skáldskaparmál, although Óðinn changes attire into an "eagle skin" (arnarhamr), this is interpreted as assuming an "eagle-form" or "shape", especially by later scholars; meanwhile, scholar Ruggerini argues Óðinn can use shape-shifting magic without the need of such skin, in contrast to the jötunn Suttung, who must put on his "eagle skin" (arnarhamr) in order to pursue him. (Note: Gunnel notes that Oðinn's heiti Arnhöfði ('eagle head') may be a reference to him assuming the eagle shape to flee from Suttungr.)

=== Völsunga saga ===
In the Völsunga saga, the wife of King Rerir is unable to conceive a child and so the couple prays to Oðinn and Frigg for help. Hearing this, Frigg then sends one of her maids (Hljóð, possibly a valkyrja) wearing a krákuhamr (crow-cloak) to give the royal couple a magic apple which when eaten, made the queen pregnant with her son Völsung.

=== Swan maidens ===
There were also the three swan-maidens, also described as valkyrjur, and owned sets of "swan's garments" or "swan cloaks" (álptarhamir; sing.:álptarhamr), and these gave the wearer the form of a swan. And the maidens were wedded to Wayland the Smith and his brothers, according to the prose prologue to Völundarkviða ("Lay of Wayland"). (Note: Prose prologue to Völundarkviða:"Þar váru hjá þeim álptarhamir þeira. Þat váru valkyrjur"; "Near them were their swan's garments. They were Valkyries"; "swan cloaks". The passage is abridged after "Slagfið..." in Vigfússon & Powell 1883, The Lay of Weyland, pp. 168–169.)

This bears similarity to the account of the eight valkyrjur with hamir in Helreið Brynhildar.

=== Wayland ===
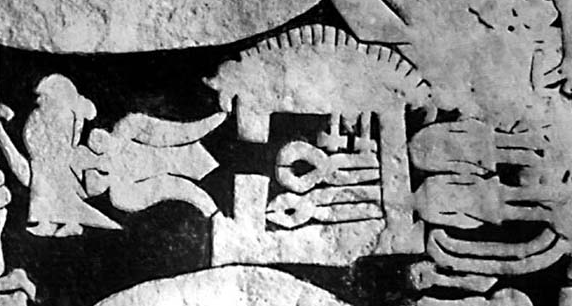
Wayland's smithy in the centre, Niðhad's daughter to the left, and Niðhad's dead sons hidden to the right of the smithy. Between the girl and the smithy, Wayland can be seen in a fjaðrhamr flying away. ―Ardre image stone VIII.

The master smith Wayland (Old Norse: Völundr) uses some sort of device to fly away and escape from King Niðhad after he is hamstrung, as described in the Eddic lay Völundarkviða. (Note: In Grimstad 1983, p. 191, it is the "second interpretation" which postulates that a transformation ring is meant; it is further explained that the ring could have belonged to the swan-maiden wife of Volund, and the ring endowed its wearer with an ability of transformation into a swan, etc. The authorities on this point of view listed (n20) are Richard Constant Boer (1907), "Völundarkviða". Arkiv för nordisk filologi 23 (Ny följd. 19): 139–140, Ferdinand Detter (1886) "Bemerkungen zu den Eddaliedern", Arkiv för nordisk filologi 3: 309–319, Halldór Halldórsson (1960) " Hringtöfrar í íslenzkum orðtökum” Íslenzk tunga 2: 18–20 Deutsche Heldensagen, pp. 10–15, Alois Wolf (München, 1965 ) "Gestaltungskerne und Gestaltungsweisen in der altgermanischen Heldendichtung", p. 84.) The lay has Völundr saying he has regained his "webbed feet" which soldiers had taken away from him, and with it he is able to soar into air. This is explained as a circumlocution for him recovering a magical artifact (perhaps a ring), which allows him to transform into a swan or such waterfowl with webbed feet. An alternate interpretation is that the text here should not be construed as "feet" but "wings" ("feather coat or artificial wings"), which gave him ability to fly away. (Note: Jan de Vries [1952] pp. 196–197 contended that the plural word fitjar in the phrase à fitjum need not be translated "webbed feet" but can be interpreted to mean "wings", cognate with Old Saxon federac and Middle Low German vittek, though McKinnel considers this problematic.) (Note: Grimstad 1983, p. 191 places "wings" vs. "ring" as the two major schools of thought on the interpretation of this phrase. As exponents of the "feather coat or a pair of artificial wings" view names (n19) Georg Baesecke (1937), A. G. van Hamel (1929) "On Völundarkviða" Arkiv för nordisk filologi 45: 161–175, Hellmut Rosenfeld (1955) and Philip Webster Souers (1943) as anticipating Jan de Vries (1952).) (Note: There is yet a third but a clear minority view that Völundr somehow regained his ability as shapeshifter to transform at will without any device.)

The second "wing" scenario coincides with the version of the story given in Þiðreks saga, where Völundr's brother Egill shot birds and collected plumage for him, providing him with the raw material for crafting a set of wings, and this latter story is also corroborated on depictions on the panels of the 8th-century whale-bone Franks Casket.

In the Þiðreks saga Wayland (here Old Norse: Velent)'s device is referred to as "wings" or rather a single "wing" (Old Norse: flygill, a term borrowed from the German Flügel) but is described as resembling a fjaðrhamr, supposedly flayed from a griffin, or vulture, or an ostrich. (Note: Old Norse: "fleginn af grip eða af gambr eða af þeim fugl er struz heitir".) (Note: The translation "griffin" here is backed by German sources, such as Franz Rolf Schröder block-quoted in English translation, and Alfred Becker. But "griffin" is lacking in Haymes's English translation: the terms gripr and gambr (gammr) are both glossed as 'vulture' in Cleasby-Vigfusson, which explains why Haymes's translation collapses three birds into two: "winged haunch of a vulture, or of a bird called ostrich". But Cleasby-Vigfusson admits gripr derives from German griff [meaning 'griffin'] and only cites this one instance in the Þiðreks saga; the word is clearly a hapax legomenon.) (Note: The fjaðrhamr has also been rendered as "feather haunch" or "winged haunch", as according to Cleasby-Vigfusson for the combined form, though the literal translation would be "feather skin".) Some modern commentators suggest that the Low German source (Note: Þiðreks saga is considered "foreign" by McKinnel since it was translated from a Low German source.) originally just meant "wings", but the Norse translators took license to interpret it as being just like a "feather cloak". (Note: Shröder, Franz Rolf (1977) "Der Name Wieland", BzN, new ser. 4:53–62, quoted by Harris 2005, p. 103.) In the saga version, Velent not only requested his brother Egill to obtain the plumage material (as aforementioned) but also asks Egill to wear the wings first to perform a test flight. Afterwards Velent himself escapes with the wings, and instructs Egil to shoot him aiming at the concealed blood sack prop to fake his death.

=== Metaphorical sense ===
As already noted, hamr could mean either a physical "skin" or the abstract "shape", and though on first blush, Freyja seems to have a (literally) a "feather cloak" she could lend to others, Larrington for instance glosses the feather cloak not as a 'skin' but an 'attribute' of the goddess which gives her ability to fly. Vincent Samson explains the hamr as the physical aspect taken on by a mobile (or transmigrating) soul (Note: In the German translation, Exkursionsseele equivalent to free-soul is used.) when undergoing animal transformation, noting that François-Xavier Dillmann defines hamr as "external form of the soul". (Note: "forme extérieure de l'âme".)

=== Germanic translations of Celtic material ===
The Breton lai of Bisclavret was translated in the Old Norse Strengleikar, the notion of "shape of animal" was rendered as hamr. Another instance of such figure of speech usage occurs in the Old Norse telling of the British king's flying contraption, cf. below:

==== Bladud's wings ====
The legendary king Bladud of the Celtic Britons fashioned himself a pair of wings (Latin: alae) to fly with, according to the original account in Geoffrey of Monmouth's Historia Regum Britanniae. (Note: Sayce, with Latin text appended in footnote as "..alis ire per summitatem aeris temptauit, translated by Evans as "..he had fashioned him wings and tried to go upon the top of the air".) This winged contraption is rendered as a "fjaðrhamr" in the Old Norse translation Breta sögur, here meant strictly as a flying suit, not a means of transformation into bird.

Bladud's wings are also rendered into Middle English as "Middle English: feðer-home", cognate with Old Norse: fjaðrhamr, in Layamon's Brut version of Geoffrey's History.

=== Other ===
There are bird-people depicted on the Oseberg tapestry fragments, which may be some personage or deity wearing winged cloaks, but it is difficult to identify the figures or even ascertain gender.

== Celtic ==
King Bladud of Britain created artificial wings to enable flight according to Galfridian sources, conceived of as "feather skin" in Old Norse and Middle English versions (as already discussed above in § Bladud's wings).

=== Poet's cloak ===
In Ireland, the elite class of poets known as the filid wore a feathered cloak, the tuigen, according to Sanas Cormaic ("Cormac's glossary"). Although the term may merely refer to a "precious" sort of toga, as Cormac glosses in Latin, it can also signify tuige 'covering ' tuige 'of birds', and the Glossary goes on to describe the composition of this garment in minute detail. (Note: Atkinson (1901) did register some doubt whether this was a genuine bird-skin garment from the very beginning which was thus name aptly, or an ex post facto explanation later developed, based on the name (or the conjectural etymology thereof). Atkinson's reservation is also noted in the eDIL.)

Cormac's glossary describes the tuigen as follows: "for it is of skins (croiccenn, dat. chroicnib) of birds white and many-coloured that the poets' toga is made from their girdle downwards, and of [male] mallards' necks and of their crests from the girdle upwards to their neck". (Note: Supplementing "[male] mallard" as O'Donovan abridged the term coilech to indicate gender, and lachu does not specify this species but is 'duck in general', while coilech lachan is "wild drake". Joyce substituted "mallards" with "drakes".)

Although John O'Donovan recognized an attestation to the cloak in the Lebor na Cert ("Book of Rights"), where verses by Benén mac Sescnéin are quoted, this may be an artefact of interpretive translation. In O'Donovan's rendition, the verse reads that the rights of the Kings of Cashel rested with the chief poet of Ireland, together with his bird cloak (Taiḋean), where the term taeidhean (normalized as taiden) is construed to be synonymous with tugen. (Note: Here "chief poet" was used by O'Donovan for suaiḋ, whereas Myles Dillon gave "sage" (for suíd. Cf. suí glossed as "I(a) man of learning, scholar, wise man, sage"; "More specifically head of a monastic or poetic school". The term differs from ollam (ard-ollam) or éces (éices) which usually correspond to "chief poet".) However, taíden is glossed as "Band, troop, company" and in a modern translation Myles Dillon renders the same line ("Fogébthar i taeib na taídean") as "The answer will always be found at the assemblies" with no mention of the bird cloak.

The tuigen is also described in the Immacallam in dá Thuarad ("The Colloquy of the two Sages"). According to the narrative, in Ulster, Néde son of Adna gains the ollam’s position ("ollaveship") of his father, supplanting the newly appointed Ferchertne, then goes on to sit on the ollam’s chair and wears the ollam’s robe (Old Irish: tuignech), which were of three colors, (Note: The "Tri datha na tugnigi (Three were the colours of the robe)" text is given under "tuignech" in eDIL, which notes the word is formed from tuigen.) (Note: Connellan's brief summary states "Tuidhean or Ollav's robe".) i.e., a band of bright bird's feathers in the middle, speckling of findruine (electrum) metal on the bottom, and "golden colour on the upper half". The tuigen is also mentioned in passing when Ferchertne speaks poetically and identifies his usurper as the young Néde, undeceived by the fake beard of grass. (Note: Carey's translation of the opening lines mentioning tuigen is Ferchertne saying: "Who is the poet, the poet whose mantle would be his glory?" Carey interprets Néde's beard of fér to have been made of "moss".)

The tuigen is also referred to (albeit allegorically) in the 17th elegy written for Eochaidh Ó hÉoghusa.

In the Old Norwegian work Konungs skuggsjá ("King's Mirror"), one can read a description of lunatics called "gelts" sprouting feathers, in the chapter dealing with Irish marvels (XI):

There is still another matter, that about the men who are called “gelts,” which must seem wonderful. Men appear to become gelts in this way: when hostile forces meet and are drawn up in two lines and both set up a terrifying battle-cry, it happens that timid and youthful men who have never been in the host before are sometimes seized with such fear and terror that they lose their wits and run away from the rest into the forest, where they seek food like beasts and shun the meeting of men like wild animals. It is also told that if these people live in the woods for twenty winters in this way, feathers will grow upon their bodies as on birds; these serve to protect them from frost and cold, but they have no large feathers to use in flight as birds have. But so great is their fleetness said to be that it is not possible for other men or even for greyhounds to come near them; for those men can dash up into a tree almost as swiftly as apes or squirrels.

— tr. by Laurence M. Larson (original text in Old Norse/Old Norwegian)

Regarding the above description of the "Gelts" (cf.) sprouting feathers, it refers to the Irish word geilt meaning a "lunatic" induced into madness by fear from battle such as described in "King's Mirror" above. The word geilt also occurs as a nickname for "Suibne Geilt" or "Mad Sweeney" who transforms into a feathered form according to the medieval narrative Buile Shuibhne.

This concept is adapted to the Greco-Roman mythology; Mercury, god of medicine, wears a "bird covering" or "feather mantle" rather than talaria (usually conceived of as feathered slippers) in medieval Irish versions of classical literature, such as the Aeneid.

== China ==
A stirt concerning the guhuoniao (姑獲鳥 translated as "wench bird") found in the Xuan zhong ji (玄中記, "Records from Inside the Mysterious", 3-4th cent.) as quoted in the Bencao Gangmu describes a creature which uses a yimao (衣毛, lit. "garment hair", translated as "feather garment") to transform into a bird; it can then shed the feathers to transform into a human woman, and attempts to snatch away human children, being childless herself.

The surviving text of Guo Pu's Xuan zhong ji continues on, and appends another tale that is more of the typical swan maiden type, where a youth from Yuzhang Area steals the yimao (as above, "feather robe") from one of six or seven maidens, the others fly away as birds, but the man forces the earthbound maiden to marry him. She later discovers her robe under a pile of rice (rice-haystack) and flies away. She returns with three more cloaks for her three daughters, and flies away with them. These bird-women were later called guiche (鬼車, "demon wagon", described elsewhere as a nine-headed bird (Note: Ter Haar: "in a variant where the Demon Wagon has nine heads and ten necks".)). This is arguably the oldest example of the swan maiden type tale, with a slight variant of near contemporaneous date found in the Sou shen ji (In Search of the Supernatural, 4th cent.), (Note: Ding is probably aware, but her focus is not this swan maiden tale but rather the "silkworm-horseskin myth" of ascent to heaven in Sou shen ji.) where the setting is given more precisely as Xinyu town (新喩縣) in Yuzhang Area. (Note: Hsieh gives: "Hsin-yü District of Yü-chang" in Wade-Giles transliteration.) (Note: Original text of Sou shen ji Book 14: "豫章新喩縣男子見田中有六七女皆衣毛衣..)

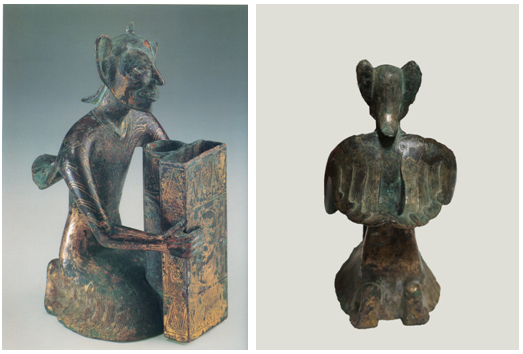
Bronze statuette of yuren "feather-human" ―Unearthed from Chang'an city ruins from the Eastern Han dynasty.

In the Chinese Daoist concept of gods and immortals (神仙, shenxian), these immortals wear feather garments or yuyi (羽衣). The xian also included human-born Daoists who purportedly attained immortality. These immortals have their antecedents in the myth of "feather-humans" or "winged men" (yuren, 羽人). These "winged spirits" occur in ancient art, such as Han dynasty cast bronzes, and an example (cf. fig. right) appear to be clothed and possess a pair of wings. (Note: Kitamura lists other iconographic examples, such as Eastern Han tomb murals where he comments that the feathered man wears "a cape-like yuyi resembling a mino" or Japanese straw cape.".) Early literary attestations are rather scant, though the Chu Ci (楚辞) anthology may be cited (poetic work entitled Yuan You) as mentioning the yuren.

These yuren were originally supernatural divinities and strictly non-human, but later conflated or strongly associated with the xian (仙/僊) immortals, which Daoist adepts could aspire to become.

The Book of Han (Note: Under the "Treatise on Suburban Sacrifices" (郊祀志).) records that the Emperor Wu of Han allowed the fangshi sorcerer Luan Da (Note: Luan Da aka General of Wuli (or "five benefits"; 五利将軍.) to wear a feathered garment in his presence, interpreted to be the granting of the privilege to publicly appeal the sorcerer's attainment of the winged immortal's power or status. A later commentator of the early Tang dynasty, Yan Shigu clarifies that the winged garment yuyi was made from bird feathers, and signifies the gods and immortals taking flight. (Note: Yan Shigu: "羽衣,以鳥羽為衣,取其神仙飛翔之意也". Cited/translated in Kosugi 1988, p. 2, Kitamura 1993, p. 57.)

In the early Tang (or rather Wu Zhou) dynasty, the Empress Wu Zetian commanded her favorite paramour Daoist Zhang Changzong to be dressed up in a mock-up of famed Dao master Wang Ziqiao. Part of the costume set he wore included a "bird-feathered coat". The coat was referred to as a ji cui (集翠), that is to say, made from the gathered feathers of the kingfisher (feizui, 翡翠). (Note: As recorded in Xue Yongruo's Shu yi ji ("Records of the Collected Strange": 集異記).) (Note: Later during the Qing dynasties, kingfisher feather headdresses were worn by empresses, with several surviving examples. They appear in Song period portraits also.)

=== Shift to silk garment ===
Regarding the High Tang period Emperor Xuanzong, legend has it that he composed or arranged the Nishang yuyi qu ("Melody of the Rainbow Skirts, Feathered Coats"). According to the fabulous account (preserved in Taiping Guangji), the Emperor was conveyed to the immortal realm (Lunar Palace) by a xian named Luo Gongyuan. The "rainbow skirts" and "feathered coats" in the tune's title have been surmised by commentators to refer to the clothing described as worn by the dancing immortal women in this account, namely the "white loose-fitting silk dress". Hence it is supposed that in the popular image of those times, the celestial "feather coats" were being regarded as silken, more specifically "white glossed silk" garments. (Note: The Chinese text has sulian (素練), and Ando explains in Japanese that this is "white neri-kinu (練り絹), literally "kneaded silk" but rendered as "glossed silk". Cf. the explanation of the term nerinuki (練緯) literally "kneaded weft", described as having "weft threads of glossed silk (degummed; sericin removed)".)

In modern times, a number of folktales have been collected from all over China that are classed as the swan-maiden type, which are renditions of the Weaver Maiden and the Cowherd legend. These consequently may not strictly have a "feather garment" as the implement in the flying motif. In the tale type, the Weaver Maiden is usually forcibly taken back to her celestial home, and the earthly Cowherd follows after, using various items, including heavenly costumes and girdles, but also oxen or oxhide in many cases. Although flight using oxhide seems counterintuitive, Wu Xiadon (呉暁東) has devised the theory that the Weaver Girl's primordial form was the silkworm (silkworm-woman), and the ancient silk-woman or silk-horse myth, where a girl wrapped in the skin of her favorite horse metamorphoses into a silkworm. (Note: Wu (2016) apud Ding 2023, pp. 51, 52–53, 55–56) (Note: For a short synopsis of the myth, see Birrell.) But even disregarding this theory, the Weaver Girl in China is considered (less a divinity of plant fiber weaving) and more a divinity of silk and sericulture, a being who descended from heaven and taught mankind how to raise silkworms. Namely, the notion that the celestial Weaver Girl raised silkworms in heaven, spun the thread into silk, and wore the woven silk garment is a widely accepted piece of lore.

=== Crane cloak ===
Cloth or clothing with the down of the crane woven in were called hechang (鶴氅) or [he]changyi ([鶴]氅衣, lit. "crane down clothing"), and existed as actual pieces of clothing by the Tang Dynasty. It was standard uniform for courtly guards during Tang and Song, but both men and women civilians wore them also. A Taoist priest (daoshi) or adept (fangshi) wore these as well. It is also mentioned in the famous novel Dream of the Red Chamber that the ladies Lin Daiyu and Xue Baochai wore such "crane cloak".

== Japan ==
In Japan, there are also swan maiden type legends about a tennyo (天女 "heavenly woman") coming to the earthly world and having her feather garment or hagoromo (羽衣) stolen. This hagoromo is variously translated as "feather cloak", or "feather robe", etc. The oldest attestation is localized at Lake Yogo in Ōmi Province (now Shiga Prefecture) and was recorded in a fragmentary quote from the lost Fudoki of that province (Ōmi no kuni fudoki).

There is also the well-known folktale of the Tsuru no Ongaeshi (鶴の恩返し; lit. "Crane's Return of a Favor"), where the crane-wife weaves fine cloth out of her own feathers, which might bear some relationship with the heavenly feather cloak. (Note: Cf. § China, regarding "crane cloak" (hechang, 鶴氅, lit. "crane down").)

The miniature boy deity Sukunabikona is described as wearing a garment made of wren's feathers in the Nihon shoki. (Note: Cf. Como's preceding discussion on the lore of the Weaver Maiden and the Cowherd (Japanese tanabata festival). Note that the notable Chinese analogue to the tennyo/hagoromo (heavenly maid/feather cloak) legend is the astrological Weaver Maiden and Cowherd legend, as discussed above in § China)

The Nara Period (8th century) Torige Tachi-Onna Byōbu (鳥毛立女屏風) refers to a byōbu or a folding "screen with figures of ladies standing; design worked out with birds' feathers". That is to say, almost looks like a monochrome line-painting or biaomiao piece, but had feathers of the copper pheasant (Note: While not directly relevant here, the feathers were determined to belong to yamadori or copper pheasant, endemic to Japan, which established the artwork as having been created in Japan, not imported from China.) pasted on them. In particular, the 2nd panel of 6 depicts a woman with a peculiar costume said to be a "feather garment", with "petal-shaped lobes overlapping like scales, extending from top to bottom". (Note: Hayashi: "花弁状の形を上から下まで鱗状に重ねて") This is said to indicate the Japanese court's awareness of the trend in Tang Dynasty China of wearing garments using bird feathers. Art historian Kazuo Kosugi goes as far as to say this was an homage or allusion to the Chinese Daoist tradition that divinity and immortals wore yingyi made of bird's feathers.

The ancient swan maiden type myth does not only occur in the Ōmi fudoki where the heavenly woman is forcibly married to a man. In different tale found in the Tango fudoki, the heavenly woman is forcibly adopted by an old childless couple. Although only the former text explicitly mentions "feather robe", and the Tango version only says it was the heavenly woman's costume (衣裳, ishō) which was hidden away, it is surmised that the feather garment was meant there as well.

In The Tale of the Bamboo Cutter (written down in the Heian Period?), Princess Kaguya mounts a flying cart and ascends to the "Moon Palace", while the angelic tennin who arrived to escort her also brought for her the hagoromo feather garment as well as the medicine of immortality and agelessness. Due to the flying car, the feather garment here is supposedly not a direct means for her to be able to fly, (Note: And the tennin, also are riding clouds, rather than flying with the feather robe, as is pointed out.) and it is guessed to be an article of clothing she needs in order for her to transform or revert back into a genuine celestial being. (Note: Ando 2012, pp. 10–11, citing Hideaki Horiuchi. Ando 2012, p. 11, citing Hideo Watanabe.) It is pointed out that many scholars assume the tennin here to be the dictionary definition Buddhist entities, but the concept of immortality is incongruent with the Buddhist core tenet of transience and rebirth, so the tennin must really be regarded as the borrowing of divinities and immortals (xian; 仙/僊) of Taoism.

=== As silken attire or scarf ===
The ancient legend about the Princess Tsuminoe classed as a hagoromo densetsu ("tradition of the robe of feathers") fails to clarify how she was able to fly away as tennnyo (in the older version). But the legend has a later Heian Period version where she put on a hire, i.e., a scarf (肩巾 or 領巾) and took flight.

In other words, the so-called "feather robe" hagoromo came to be commonly depicted as what can only be described as the sheer silk scarf, called "hire (領巾)" in olden times. (Note: Quoting waka poet and critic Tomohiko Sunaga: "[what] the ancient people called a hire (領巾), a sheer silk, thin scarf 古代の人々が「領巾」と称した薄絹の細長いスカーフ" or, "the Benten or Kisshōten's long, thin cloth worn floatingly around their shoulders 弁天様や吉祥天女がふわりと肩に被いている細長い布".)

Later in the Muromachi Period, in performances of the Noh play Hagoromo, the dancing actor portraying the heavenly female tennyo wears a supposed hagoromo feather garment. The prop costume is apparently made from whitish thin silk (or sometimes, thicker colorful silk). Though the theatrical convention serves merely as a hint to what the original hagoromo garment was like, (Note: Nunome notes that given the association of the stock phrase ten'i muhō (天衣無縫) meaning "seamless", the Noh costume which is clearly not seamless must be regarded as "altered それにふさわしく変形されたもの", only approximating the genuine item.) but since sheer silk has been prized since the ancient Han or earlier, and even unearthed in Japanese Yayoi period sites, (Note: Yoshinogari site.) the hagoromo legend costume may well share origins with the tennnyo images found in Buddhist temples, etc. (Note: More specifically according to Nunome, tennyo as depicted in Asuka and Nara Period temples in Japan, and cave art at the Dunhuang site in China.) according to scholar Junrō Nunome, professedly speaking out of his textile expertise, being a non-folklorist.

One caveat is that even though dictionaries typically define tennyo (lit. "heavenly woman") as a Buddhist female entity, (Note: Nunome mentions dictionary look up, and Ando gives quote followed by explanatory.) it has been pointed out that tennyo is actually a "heavenly" female from Taoism, one among the deities and immortals (神仙, shenxian) who dwell in the xian realm. This caveat also applies to the Bamboo Cutter's daughter Kaguya, who ascends to the "Moon Palace". As for the Nara Period work of art using real bird feathers, it has been theorized (by Kosugi) that it alludes to the feather garments of the shenxian, as aforementioned.

But even in the context of the shenxian garments, later literature dating to the golden age of Tang ascribe the Daoist heavenly immortals wearing spun and softened silk, as in the legendary tale surrounding the "Melody of the Rainbow Gown and the Feathered Robe" (q.v., § China above). (Note: The Chinese text gives 素練, which refers to white glossed silk (練り絹, nerikinu) according to Ando. An Edo Period source (『貞享記』 (Jōteiki)) cited by Nunome contrarily states that the ama no hagoromo was made of raw silk (生絹, kiginu) or unglossed silk.)

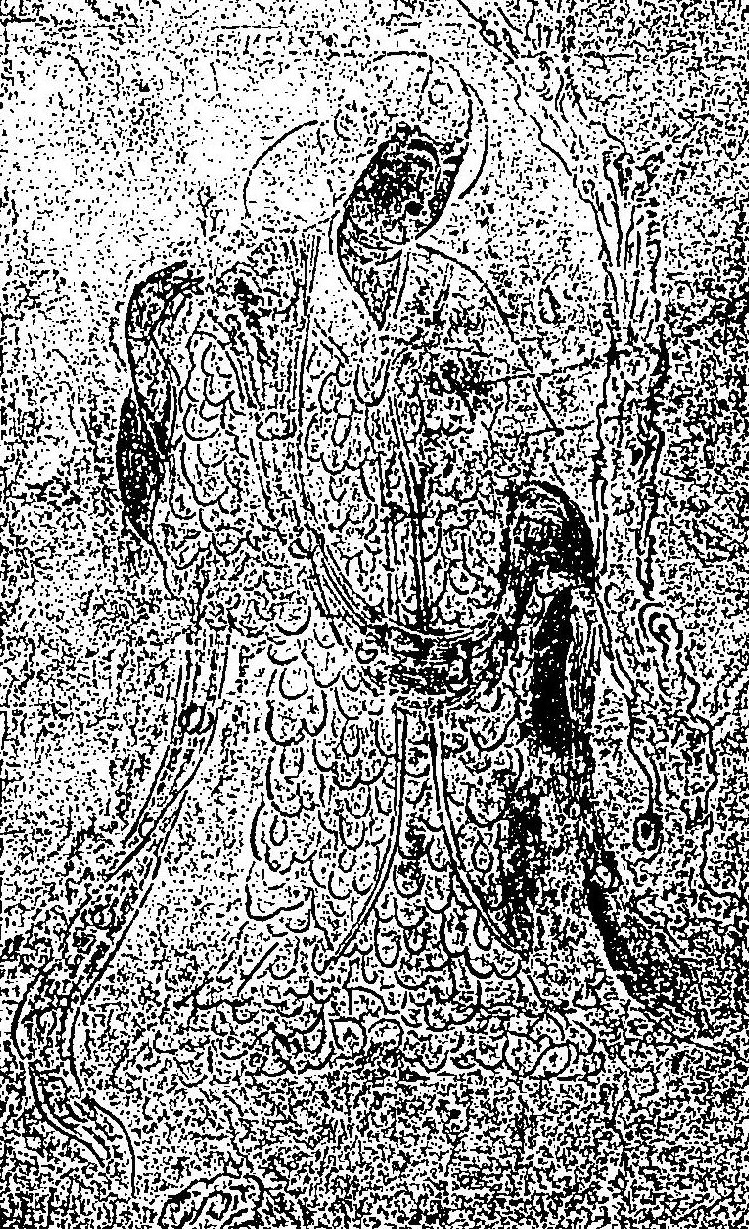
Woman wearing feather cloak.
―Torige ritusjo no byōbu, Panel 2. Nara Period. Painting with bird feathers. (Note: Full color images available at Shōsōin site.)

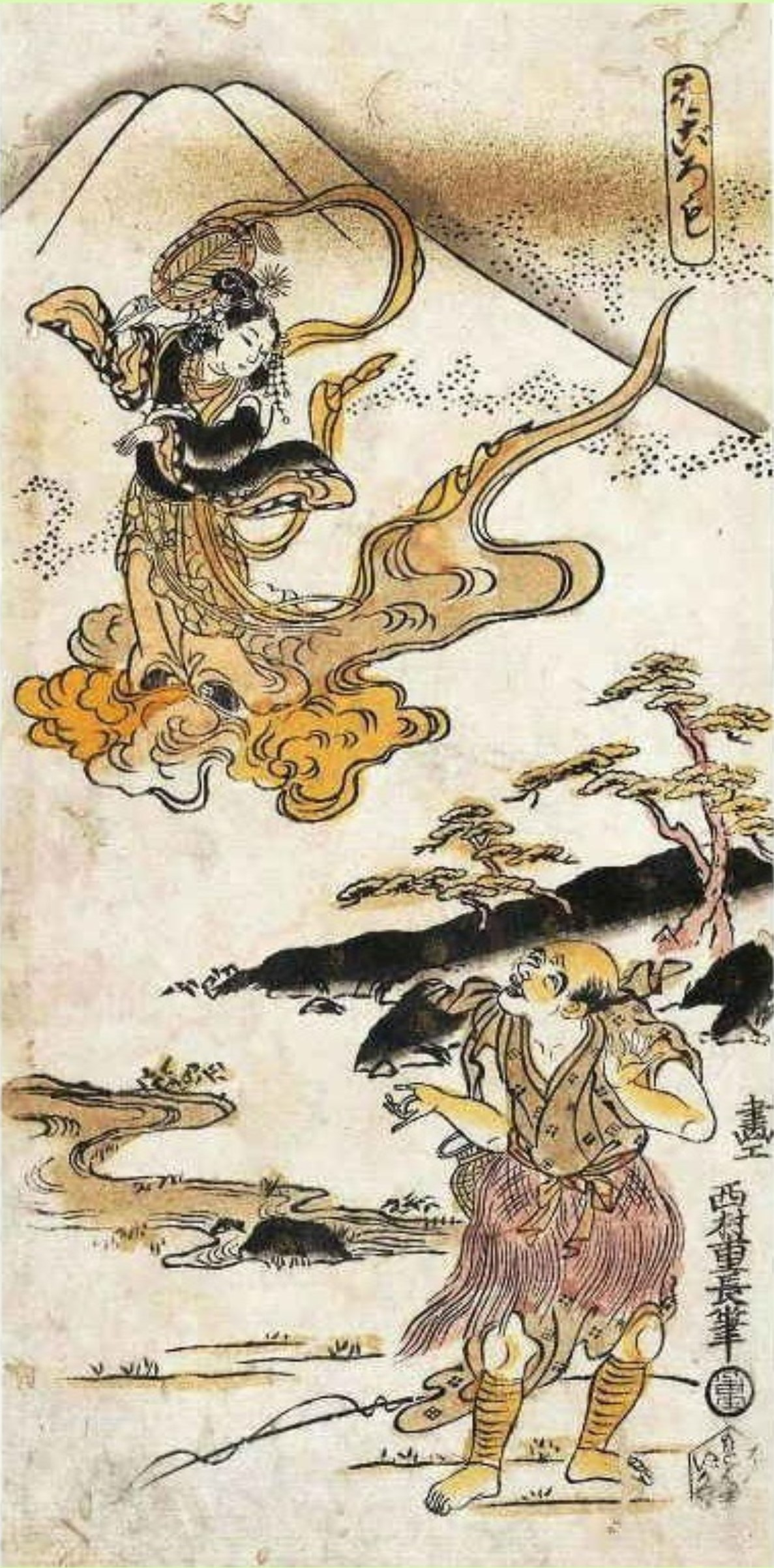
A tennyo (female tennin) wearing a scarf-like hagoromo "feather cloak".
―Painting depicting a scene from Noh play Hagoromo.

== Bibliography ==
=== Primary ===
- ""Mythic and legendary tales from Skaldskaparmal: §The Theft of Idunn and Her Apples; §Loki Retrieves Idunn from the Giant Thiazi"". The Prose Edda. Translated by Byock, Jesse. Penguin UK. 2005. ISBN 9780141912745. and "Introduction", p. xxii, 'valshamr'.
- Crawford, Jackson (2017). The Saga of the Volsungs: With the Saga of Ragnar Lothbrok. Hackett Publishing Company, Inc. ISBN 9781624666339.
- Sveinbjörn Egilsson, ed. (1848). "Bragaræður 56 & 58". Edda Snorra Sturlusonar. Vol. 3. Copenhagen.
- Edda: Snorri Sturluson. Everyman Library. Translated by Faulkes, Anthony. J. M. Dent. 1995 [1987]. pp. 60, 81–83, 84. ISBN 978-0-4608-7616-2. The chapter numbering follows the 1848 Copenhagen edition, which is the one usually cited (p. xxiii).
- Haymes, Edward R., tr. (1988). The Saga of Thidrek of Bern. Garland. ISBN 0-8240-8489-6.
- Eiríkur Jónsson; Finnur Jónsson, eds. (1892–1896). Breta sögur. Hauksbók:udgiven efter de Arnamagnænske Händskrifter No. 371, 544 og 675 4º. samt forskellige Papirshändskrifter. Kongelige Nordiske oldskriftselskab (Denmark). Copenhagen: Thieles bogtr. "Af Madann", c. 12, line 157ff. (p. 248). "het Bladvð er riki.. .xx. vetr konengr verit þa let hann gera ser fiaðrham"
- Finnur Jónsson, ed. (1900). Snorri Sturluson Edda. Købnhavn: G.E.C. Gad.
- Finnur Jónsson, ed. (1905). Sæmundar-Edda: Eddukvæði. Reykjavík: S. Kristjánsson.
- The Elder Edda: A Book of Viking Lore. Translated by Orchard, Andy. London: Penguin Books. 2011. ISBN 9780141393728.
- Thorpe, Benjamin (1851). "Thor in the house of Geirröd (Geirröðr)". Northern Mythology. Edward Lumley. pp. 52–53.
- Unger, Henrik, ed. (1853). Saga Điðriks konungs af Bern: Fortælling om Kong Thidrik af Bern og hans kæmper, i norsk bearbeidelse fra det trettende aarhundrede efter tydske kilder. Christiania: Feilberg & Landmark. pp. 92–94.
- Vigfússon, Guðbrandur; Powell, Frederick York, eds. (1883). Corpus poeticum boreale: the poetry of the old northern tongue, from the earliest times to the thirteenth century (in Icelandic and English). Vol. 1. Clarendon Press.

=== Secondary ===
(Hawaiian material)

- Hiroa, Te Rangi (1944). "The Local Evolution of Hawaiian Feather Capes and Cloaks". The Journal of the Polynesian Society. 53 (1): 1–16. Archived from the original on 14 October 2008.
- Holt, John Dominis (1985). The Art of Featherwork in Old Hawai'i. Topgallant Publishing Company. ISBN 9780914916680.
- Sinclair, Marjorie (1976). Nāhiʻenaʻena, Sacred Daughter of Hawaiʻi. University Press of Hawaii. ISBN 9780824803674.
  - —— (1995). Nahi'ena'ena: Sacred Daughter of Hawaii. Mutual Publishing LLC. ISBN 9781566470803.

(Brazilian material)

- Buono, Amy (2012). "14. Crafts of Color: Tupi Tapirage in Early Colonial Brazil". In Feeser, Andrea; Goggin, Maureen Daly; Tobin, Beth Fowkes (eds.). The Materiality of Color: The Production, Circulation, and Application of Dyes and Pigments, 1400-1800. Ashgate Publishing, Ltd. pp. 235–246. ISBN 9781409429159.
- Françozo, Mariana (2015). "Beyond the kunstakammer. Brazilian featherwork in early modern Europe". In Gerritsen, Anne; Riello, Giorgio (eds.). The Global Lives of Things: The Material Culture of Connections in the Early Modern World. Routledge. pp. 105–127. ISBN 9781317374565.

(European material)

- Egeler, Matthias (2009). "Keltisch-mediterrane Perspektiven auf die altnordischen Walkürenvorstellungen". In Heizmann, Wilhelm; Böldl, Klaus; Beck, Heinrich (eds.). Analecta Septentrionalia: Beiträge zur nordgermanischen Kultur- und Literaturgeschichte. Ergänzungsbände zum Reallexikon der Germanischen Altertumskunde 65 (in German). Walter de Gruyter. pp. 393–466. ISBN 9783110218701.
- Grimstad, Kaaren (1983). "The Revenge of Völundr". In Glendinning, Robert James; Haraldur Bessason [in Icelandic] (eds.). Edda: A Collection of Essays. University of Manitoba Press. pp. 187–209. ISBN 9780887553196.
- Ruggerini, Maria Elena (2006). "Tales of Flight in Old Norse and Medieval English Texts". Viking and Medieval Scandinavia. 2: 201–238. doi:10.1484/J.VMS.2.302024. JSTOR 45019112.

(East Asian material)

- Ando, Shigegaktsu (30 March 2012). "Taketori monogatari to shinsen shisoō: 'Ama no hagoromo' no yurai" 竹取物語と神仙思想 ―「天の羽衣」の由来― (PDF). Nihon bunka ronsō 日本文化論叢. 20. Aichi University of Education: 5–14. hdl:10424/4511.
- Hsieh, Daniel 謝立義 (2003). "The Swan-Maiden Motif in Early Chinese Classical Tales". In Su, Jui-lung; Gong, Hang (eds.). Ershiyi shiji Hon, Wei, Liuchao wenxue xin shijiao: Kang Dawei jiaoshou huajia jinian lunwen ji 廿一世紀漢魏六朝文學新視角: 康達維敎授花甲紀念論文集 [New views of Han, Wei, and Six dynasties literature in the twenty-first century : a festschrift in honor of professor David R. Knechtges on his sixtieth birthday]. Wenjin chubanshe. pp. 415–470. ISBN 9789576687204.
- Kitamura, Haruka (September 1993). "Ujin zō wo chūshin to suru 'Kandai shinsen sekaizu' kō" 羽人像を中心とする「漢代神仙世界図」考 [Studies of the Winged Figure Image (Yuren Xiang : 羽人像) of the 'Han Dynasty Shenxian (神仙) Pictorial World']. Bigaku 美學 [Aesthetics]. 44 (2): 57–68. doi:10.20631/bigaku.44.2_57.
- Kosugi, Kazuo [in Japanese] (1988). "Shinsen no ui wo ronjite torige tachi-onna byōbu ni oyobu" 神仙の羽衣を論じて鳥毛立女屏風に及ぶ [The Shen-Xian(神仙)'s Robe covered with bird's feathers and Torige Tachi-Onna Byōbu in Shōsōin]. Bijutsuhi kenkyū 美術史研究 [The Study of the History of Art]. 26. Waseda University: 1–23.
- Miller, Alan L. (1987). "The Swan-Maiden Revisited: Religious Significance of "Divine-Wife" Folktales with Special Reference to Japan". Asian Folklore Studies. 46 (1). Nanzan University Institute of Anthropology: 55–86. doi:10.2307/1177885. JSTOR 1177885.
- Nunome, Junrō (March 1996). "Tennyo no hagoromo" 天女の羽衣(はごろも). Nihon bijutsu kōgei 日本美術工芸 (690). Osaka: NIhon bijutsu kogeisha: 11–15.
- Ozaki, Nobuo (1986). "Taketori no okina" 竹取の翁. Kokubugaku nenji betsu ronbunshū: Jōdai dai 2 bu 国文学年次別論文集: 上代 第2部. Vol. 44. Hōbun shuppan. pp. 238–243. doi:10.20631/bigaku.44.2_57.
  - Ozaki, Nobuo (1986) "Taketori no okina; jō 竹取の翁-上-」, Gakuen 学苑 (563), pp. 2–12 (original journal publication)
- Sugiyama, Sueo (1942). "2. Hagoromo to mino" ニ、羽衣と蓑. Nihon genshi seni kōgeishi dozokuron 日本原始繊維工芸史 土俗編 (in Japanese). Yuzankaku. pp. 41–42. ndldm:1872149.
- Tei, Kagei / Ding, Jiayun (April 2023). "Chūgoku 'Shichseki gata・tennin nyōbō' ni okeru ushi no kawa ni tuite no kōsatsu" 中国「七夕型・天人女房」における牛の皮についての考察. Hyōgen bunka 表現文化. 12. Osaka Metropolitan University: 45–59. doi:10.24544/omu.20230403-003. ISSN 2758-786X.
- Wang, Eugene Y. (2005). "Mirror, Moon, and Memory in Eighth-Century China: From Dragon Pond to Lunar Palace" (PDF). In Brown, Claudia; Chou, Ju-hsi (eds.). Clarity and Luster: New Light on Bronze Mirrors in Tang and Post-Tang Dynasty China, 600-1300. Cleveland Museum of Art in association with Brepols. pp. 42–67. ISBN 9782503520810.
- Watanabe, HIdeao [in Japanese] (1983). "Taketori monogatari to shinsentan: bunjin to monogatari: Shoki monogatari seiritushi kaitei" 竹取物語と神仙譚 : 文人と物語・<初期物語成立史階梯>. Nihon Bungaku 日本文学. 32 (3): 26–43. doi:10.20620/nihonbungaku.32.3_26.
- Young, Serinity (2018). Women Who Fly: Goddesses, Witches, Mystics, and other Airborne Females. Oxford University Press. ISBN 9780190659691.
