= Gillingr =

Norse mythical character

Gillingr (Old Norse: [ˈɡilːeŋɡz̠]; also Gilling) is a jötunn in Norse mythology, and the father of Suttungr. Gillingr and, later, his wife are murdered by the dwarfs Fjalar and Galar. In revenge, his son Suttungr tortures the dwarfs into giving him the mead of poetry.

== Name ==
The Old Norse name Gillingr has been translated as 'screamer'. It is related to the Old Norse verb gjalla ('to scream, yell'; compare with Icelandic gjalla, Norwegian gjella, or Swedish gälla).

== Attestations ==
=== Prose Edda ===
In Skáldskaparmál (The Language of Poetry), the dwarfs Fjalar and Galar kill Gillingr by overturning his boat. When his wife hears of the news, she is "greatly distressed" and "weeps loudly" and the dwarf Galar, "weary of her howling", eventually kills her by dropping a millstone on her head.

Then these dwarfs invited to stay with them a giant called Gilling and his wife. Then the dwarfs invited Gilling to go out to sea in a boat with them. But as they went along the coast the dwarfs rowed on to a shoal and the boat capsized. Gilling could not swim and was drowned, but the dwarfs righted their boat and rowed to land.

— Skáldskaparmál, 57–58, trans. A. Faulkes, 1987.

=== Viking Age ===
Gillingr is mentioned in a skaldic verse by Eyvindr skáldaspillir (10th c. AD), who portrays the mead of poetry as "Gilling’s compensation".

I desire silence for Har’s ale [Odin’s mead, poetry] while I raise Gilling’s payment [the mead], while his descent in pot-liquid [the mead, poetry] of gallows-cargo [Odin] we trace to gods.

— Eyvindr skáldaspillir, Skáld. 3, trans. A. Faulkes, 1987.

== Legacy ==
Gillingr is also a surname, although not very common.
