= Baugi =

Norse mythical character

Baugi (Old Norse: [ˈbɔuɣe]; "ring-shaped") is a jötunn in Norse mythology. He is brother of Suttungr, the giant from whom Odin obtained the mead of poetry.

== Name ==
The Old Norse name Baugi has been translated as 'ring-shaped'.

== Attestations ==
The name of the jötunn Baugi is only mentioned in Skáldskaparmál (The Language of Poetry) and in the þulur, and is not attested in other poetic texts. It is notably absent from Hávamál (Words of the High One), which Snorri Sturluson used as a source for the story of the mead of poetry. Some scholars have argued that Baugi may have been an invention or a misunderstanding of Hávamál by Snorri.

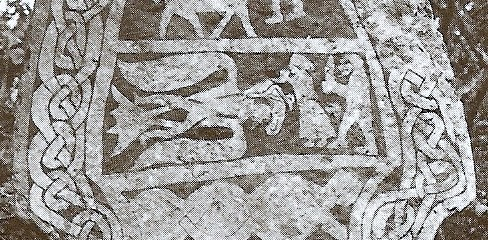
The Gotlandic image stone Stora Hammars III is held to depict Odin in his eagle fetch (note the eagle's beard), Gunnlöð holding the mead of poetry, and Suttungr.

=== Mead of poetry ===
In Skáldskaparmál, Odin causes Baugi's nine slaves to kill each other in his quest to obtain the mead of poetry, possessed at that time by Baugi's brother, Suttungr. Calling himself Bölverk ('Evil-deed' or 'Evil worker'), Odin then offers to do the labour of all nine men for Baugi as a reparation for his wrongdoings, in exchange of a wage of one drink of the mead of poetry. Baugi accepts to help him acquire it from his brother.

After the summer of work is over, Bölverk (Odin) asks for his payment, but Suttungr refuses to give him a single drop of the mead. Bölverk then enlists Baugi's help to dig a hole into the Hnitbjörg mountain with Baugi's drill, Rati, in order to reach the chamber where the mead was kept and watched over by Gunnlöð, Suttung’s daughter. When Baugi announces to him that the tunnel is finished, Bölverk blows into the hole but realizes that the other end is still blocked. As he understands that Baugi is trying to deceive him, Bölverk turns himself into a snake and slips into the hole. Baugi tries to strike at him with his auger but misses.
