= Óðrerir =

Vessel containing the mead of poetry in Norse mythology

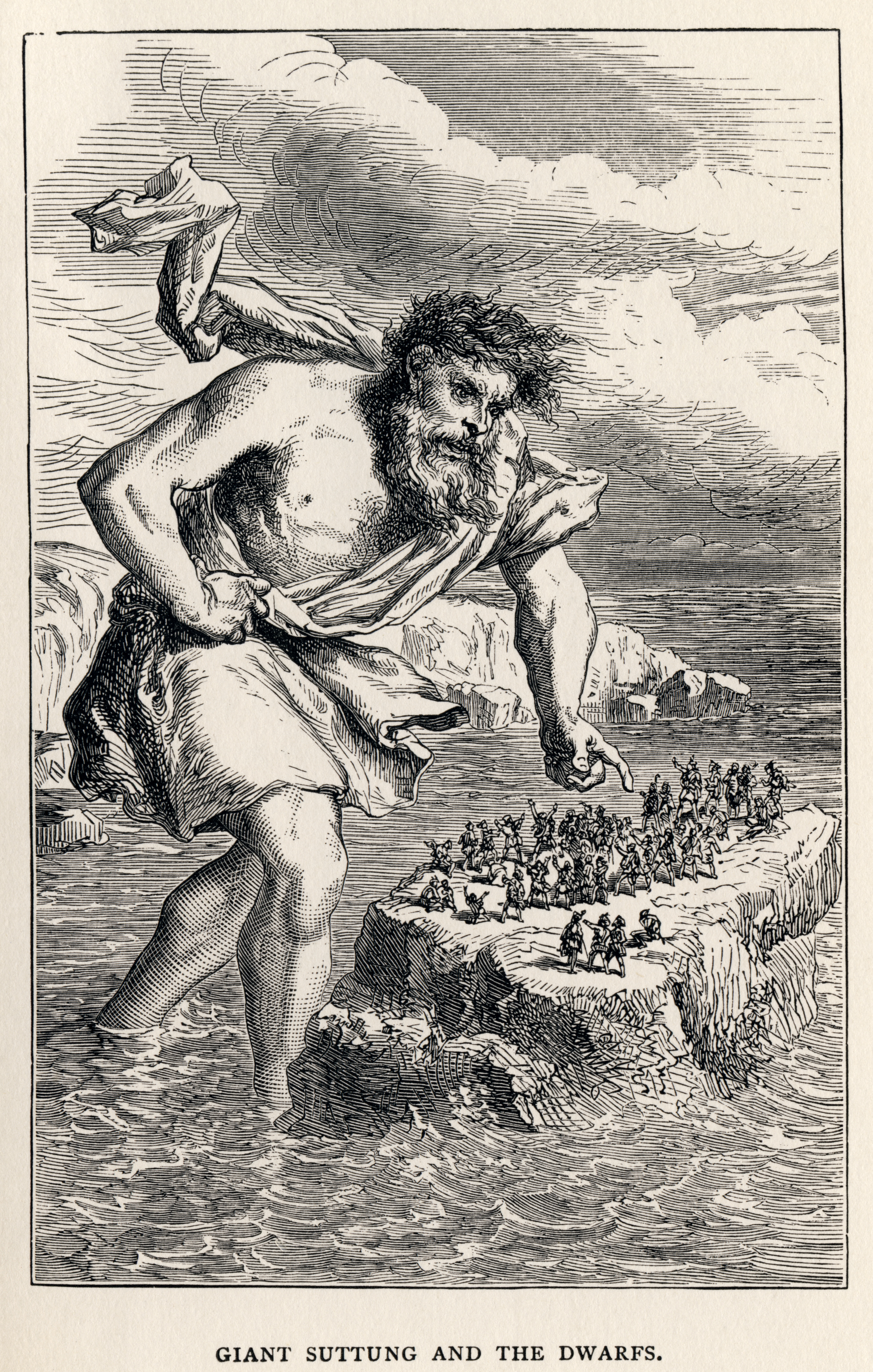

In Norse mythology, Óðrerir, Óðrørir or Óðrœrir refers either to one of the three vessels that contain the mead of poetry (along with Boðn and Són) or to the mead itself.

== Attestations ==
=== Poetic Edda ===
Óðrerir is mentioned in two ambiguous passages of the Hávamál. In a first stanza (107), it is sometimes assumed that Óðrerir is synonymous with mead of poetry, but both interpretations are possible.

Of a well-assumed form
I made good use:
few things fail the wise;
for Odhrærir
is now come up
to men’s earthly dwellings

—Hávamál (107), Thorpe's translation

In another stanza (140), the meaning of Óðrerir depends on the translation.

Fimbulljóð níu nam ek af inum frægja syni Bölþorns, Bestlu föður, ok ek drykk of gat ins dýra mjaðar, ausinn Óðreri. —Hávamál (140), Guðni Jónsson's edition	Potent songs nine from the famed son I learned of Bölthorn, Bestla’s sire, and a draught obtained of the precious mead, drawn from Odhrærir. —Hávamál (142), Thorpe's translation

In most translations, Óðrerir seems to refer to a vessel, but other interpretations of ausinn Óðreri are possible, which can lead to understand Óðrerir to be the mead itself.

=== Prose Edda ===
For Snorri Sturluson, Óðrerir is the name of the kettle in which Kvasir's blood was mixed with honey to create the mead:

[Kvasir] went up and down the earth to give instruction to men; and when he came upon invitation to the abode of certain dwarves, Fjalar and Galarr, they called him into privy converse with them, and killed him, letting his blood run into two vats and a kettle. The kettle is named Ódrerir, and the vats Són and Bodn; they blended honey with the blood, and the outcome was that mead by the virtue of which he who drinks becomes a skald or scholar.

—Skáldskaparmál (V), Brodeur's translation

Similarly, Snorri considers that "liquid of Óðrerir and Boðn and Són" (lögr Óðreris ok Boðnar ok Sónar) is a kenning for the mead of poetry (Skáldskaparmál, 3).

But in skaldic poetry, Óðrerir is a synonym of mead of poetry and it is therefore assumed that Óðrerir as a vessel is Snorri's invention. Moreover, the etymology of the name – which can be rendered into "stirrer of inspiration" or "stirrer of fury" – suggests that it rather refers to the mead. Boðn probably means "vessel" and Són signifies either "reconciliation" or "blood".
