= Hrímgerðr =

Norse mythical character

Hrímgerðr (also Hrimgerd or Hrimgerdr; Old Norse: [ˈhriːmˌɡerðz̠], "frost-Gerðr") is a jötunn in Norse mythology.

== Name ==
The Old Norse name Hrímgerðr has been translated as 'frost-Gerðr'.

== Attestation ==
In Helgakviða Hjörvarðssonar, Hrímgerðr announces herself as the daughter of the jötunn Hati.

My name is Hrimgerd, my father’s name Hati,
whom I knew as the most mighty of giants,
many a bride he had snatched from their homes,
till Helgi hewed him down.

— Helgakviða Hjörvarðssonar, 17, transl. A. Orchard, 1997.

After the hero Helgi Hundingsbane kills her father, Hrímgerðr harasses him, and Atli Idmundsson engages her in a contest of flyting until she turns into stone in the sunrise.

[Hrimgerd said:]
‘You would neigh, if you weren’t a gelding:
Hrimgerd tosses her tail;
I think your heart is in your arse, Atli,
though you have a stallion’s voice.’

[Atli said:]
‘You’d soon learn what a stallion I was
in strength, if I stepped on shore:
you’d take a great pasting, if I so wished,
and lower your tail, Hrimgerd.’

— Helgakviða Hjörvarðssonar, 20–21, transl. A. Orchard, 1997.
