= Kvasir =

Norse deity

In Norse mythology, Kvasir (Old Norse: [ˈkwɑsez̠]) was a god born of the saliva of the Æsir and the Vanir, two tribes of gods. Extremely wise, Kvasir traveled far and wide, teaching and spreading knowledge. This continued until the dwarfs Fjalar and Galar killed Kvasir and drained him of his blood. The two mixed his blood with honey, thus creating the Mead of Poetry, a mead which imbued the drinker with skaldship and wisdom, and the spread of which eventually resulted in the introduction of poetry to mankind.

Kvasir is attested in the Prose Edda and Heimskringla, both written by Snorri Sturluson in the 13th century, and in the poetry of skalds. According to the Prose Edda, Kvasir was instrumental in the capture and binding of Loki, and an euhemerized account of the god appears in Heimskringla, where he is attested as the wisest among the Vanir.

Scholars have connected Kvasir to methods of beverage production and peacemaking practices among ancient peoples.

== Attestations ==
In the Prose Edda, Kvasir appears in the books Gylfaginning and Skáldskaparmál. Kvasir is mentioned a single time in Gylfaginning; in chapter 50, where the enthroned figure of High tells Gangleri (Gylfi in disguise) of how Loki was caught by the gods after being responsible for the murder of the god Baldr. In the chapter, High says that while Loki was hiding from the gods, he often took the form of a salmon during the day and swam in the waterfall Franangrsfors. Loki considered what sort of device the gods might craft to catch him there, and so, sitting in his four-door mountain lookout house, knotted together linen thread in "which ever since the net has been". Loki noticed that the gods were not far away from him and that Odin had spotted him from Hliðskjálf. Loki sat before a fire, and when he noticed the gods were coming near him, he threw the net into the fire and jumped up, and slipped into the river. The gods reached Loki's house, and the first to enter was Kvasir, who the High describes as "the wisest of all". Kvasir saw the shape of the net in the ash of the fire, and so realized its purpose; to catch fish. And so Kvasir told the gods about it. The gods used the shape found in the ash as their model, and with it fished Loki from the river to make him their prisoner, later binding him in torment until the coming of Ragnarök.

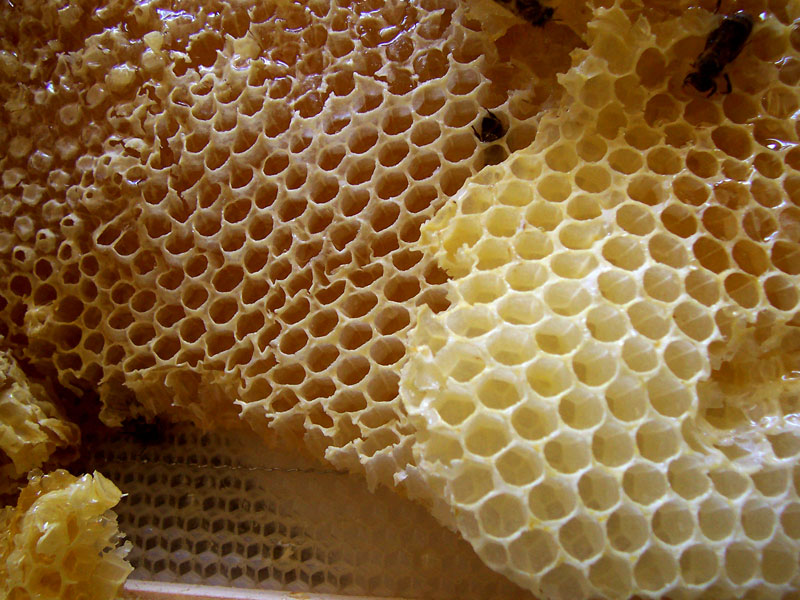
Honey combs; following his death, Kvasir's blood was drained and mixed with honey, which became the Mead of Poetry

In Skáldskaparmál, Kvasir is mentioned several times. In chapter 57 of the book, Ægir asks the skaldic god Bragi where the craft of poetry originated. Bragi says that the Æsir once wrangled with the Vanir (see Æsir–Vanir War) but eventually came together to make peace. The two groups decided to form a truce by way of both sides spitting into a vat. After they left, the gods kept the vat as a symbol of their truce, "and decided not to let it be wasted and out of it made a man". The man was named Kvasir, and he was extremely wise; he knew the answer to any question posed to him. Kvasir traveled far and wide throughout the world teaching mankind and spreading his vast knowledge. In time, two dwarfs, Fjalar and Galar, invited Kvasir to their home for a private talk. Upon Kvasir's arrival, the two dwarfs killed him and drained his blood into three objects. Two of the objects were vats, called Són and Boðn, and the third was a pot called Óðrerir. Fjalar and Galar mixed the blood with honey and made mead of it. Whoever drank of it would become a poet or scholar (Kvasir's blood had become the Mead of Poetry). The two dwarfs explained to the Æsir that Kvasir had died from "suffocating in his own intelligence", as there were none among them who were so well educated as to be able to pose him questions. Bragi then tells how the Mead of Poetry, by way of the god Odin, ultimately came into the hands of mankind.

In chapter 2 Skáldskaparmál, poetic ways of referring to poetry are provided, including "Kvasir's blood". In reference, part of Vellekla by the 10th century Icelandic skald Einarr skálaglamm is provided, where the term "Kvasir's blood" for 'poetry' is used. Further, in chapter 3, a prose narrative mentions that the Kvasir's blood was made into the Mead of Poetry.

Kvasir is mentioned in an euhemerized account of the origin of the gods in chapter 4 of Ynglinga saga, contained within Heimskringla. The chapter narrative explains that Odin waged war on the Vanir, yet the Vanir could not be defeated, and so the two decided to exchange hostages in a peace agreement. Kvasir, here a member of the Vanir and described as the "cleverest among them", is included among the hostages.

== Name ==
The etymology of the name is uncertain. The root kvas- in Kvas-ir likely stems from the Proto-Germanic base *kvass-, meaning "to squeeze, squash, crush, bruise". Regarding this etymology, linguist Albert Morey Sturtevant comments that "fluids may result from the crushing or pressing of an object (cf. Dan. kvase 'to crush something in order to squeeze out the juice'). Hence we are justified in assuming the stem syllable in kvas-ir has reference to the fluid (saliva) out of which he was created and that the name Kvas-ir denotes the person who possesses the characteristic qualities inherent in this fluid, viz., poetic inspiration and wisdom."

The same root kvas- may also be related to kvass, a fermented drink of the Slavic peoples. The common Slavic word stems from Proto-Slavic *kvasъ ("leaven", "fermented drink") and ultimately from Proto-Indo-European base *kwh₂et-. This etymological connection, as considered by some scholars (Alexander Afanasyev, Richard Heinzel, Jooseppi Julius Mikkola, Georges Dumézil, et al.), is motivated by the consideration of kvasir as a personification of fermented beverages.

== Interpretations ==
Rudolf Simek comments that kvasir likely originally referred to juice squeezed from berries and then fermented. In some ancient cultures, berries were communally chewed before being spat into a container, which exactly parallels Kvasir's mythical creation.

Simek says that Snorri's description is further proven faithful by way of the (above-mentioned) 10th-century skaldic kenning "Kvasir’s blood" (Old Norse Kvasis dreyra). He also points out strong parallels exist between the Old Norse tale of the theft of the Mead of Poetry by Odin (in the form of an eagle) and the Sanskrit tale of the theft of Soma (beverage of the gods) by the god Indra (or an eagle), and that these parallels point to a common Proto-Indo-European basis.

Further, the mixing of spit in a vat between the two groups of gods points to an ancient basis for the myth: The customs of mixing spittle and the group drinking of the intoxicating beverage are well rooted in traditional peacemaking and group binding customs among various ancient peoples.

== Modern influence ==
A Norwegian search engine, Kvasir, takes its name from the god.
