= Alois Wolf =

German philologist (1929–2020)

- Born: 12 September 1929; Micheldorf in Oberösterreich, Austria
- Died: 1 November 2020 (aged 91); Freiburg, Germany
- Awards: Theodor Körner Prize; Kulturpreis des Landes Oberösterreich

Academic background
- Education: University of Innsbruck

Academic work
- Discipline: Germanic philology
- Sub-discipline: German philology; Old Norse philology
- Institutions: University of Freiburg; University of Kiel; University of Münster
- Main interests: Medieval German literature; Scandinavian literature

Alois Wolf (12 September 1929 – 1 November 2020) was an Austrian philologist who specialized in Germanic studies. He was Professor of German Philology at the University of Freiburg.

== Biography ==
Alois Wolf was born in Micheldorf in Oberösterreich, Austria on 5 September 1929. He studied German and English at the universities of Innsbruck and Vienna, and received his Ph.D. at Innsbruck in 1953 with a thesis on the Middle High German author Gottfried von Strassburg.

Wolf subsequently studied Old Norse, and lectured from 1955 to 1959 at the universities of Hull, Strasbourg, Innsbruck and Salzburg. He completed his habilitation at Salzburg in March 1965 with a thesis on Medieval German literature. He was subsequently a professor at the universities of Münster and Kiel. From 1973 to 1994, Wolf was Professor of German Philology at the University of Freiburg. During this time he held visiting professorships at the universities of Wisconsin–Madison and Fribourg.

Wolf specialized in Germanic studies. He received the Theodor Körner Prize in 1961, the Kulturpreis des Landes Oberösterreich in 1996, and was a Corresponding Member of the Austrian Academy of Sciences. He was married and had two children.

Wolf retired from the University of Freiburg in 1994. He died in Freiburg on 1 November 2020.

== See also ==
- Rudolf Simek

== Sources ==
- Kürschners Deutscher Gelehrten Kalender 2009. K G Saur Verlag, München 2009. -- Curriculum vitae Alois Wolf, in: Alois Wolf, Das Faszinosum der mittelalterlichen Minne (Wolfgang Stammler Gastprofessur. Vorträge 5), Freiburg/Schweiz 1996.
