= Hnitbjorg =

Mountain abode of the giant Suttung in Norse mythology

In Norse mythology, Hnitbjörg is the mountain abode of the jötunn Suttungr, where he placed the mead of poetry for safekeeping under the guardianship of his daughter Gunnlöð. Odin, with the help of Suttungr's brother Baugi, drilled a hole into the mountain and thereby gained access to the mead.

== Name ==
The Old Norse Hnitbjǫrg [ˈhnitˌbjɔrɡ] can be translated as 'colliding rocks', which may have implied that the mountain could open and close, like those found in other folktales.
