= Anne Gerritsen =

Academic at Leiden University and Warwick University

Anne Gerritsen FBA FHEA FRHistS (born 1967) is professor of history at the University of Warwick. Between 2013 and 2018 she held the Kikkoman Chair in the study of Asia-Europe Exchange, with special attention to art, material culture and human dynamics at Leiden University.

== Biography ==
Gerritsen has a PhD in East Asian Languages and Civilizations from Harvard University in 2001. Gerritsen was elected as a Fellow of the British Academy in 2020. She is also a Fellow of the Higher Education Academy and the Royal Historical Society. She is a member of Academia Europaea.

== Select publications ==
- Cleetus, B. and Gerritsen, A. (eds) 2023. Histories of Health and Materiality in the Indian Ocean World: Medicine, Material Culture and Trade, 1600-2000. Bloomsbury.
- Gerritsen, A. "Reading Late-Imperial Chinese Merchant Handbooks in Global and Micro-History", Journal of Early Modern History 27 (1-2), 132–155.
- Gerritsen, A. and Grasskamp, A. (eds) 2022. Transformative Jars: Asian Ceramic Vessels As Transcultural Enclosures.
- Gerritsen, A. 2022. "The Tiger's Teeth: Local Gazetteers as Sources for Images Related to the Performance of Ritual", Journal of the European Association of Chinese Studies 3.
