= Mead of poetry =

Beverage in Norse mythology

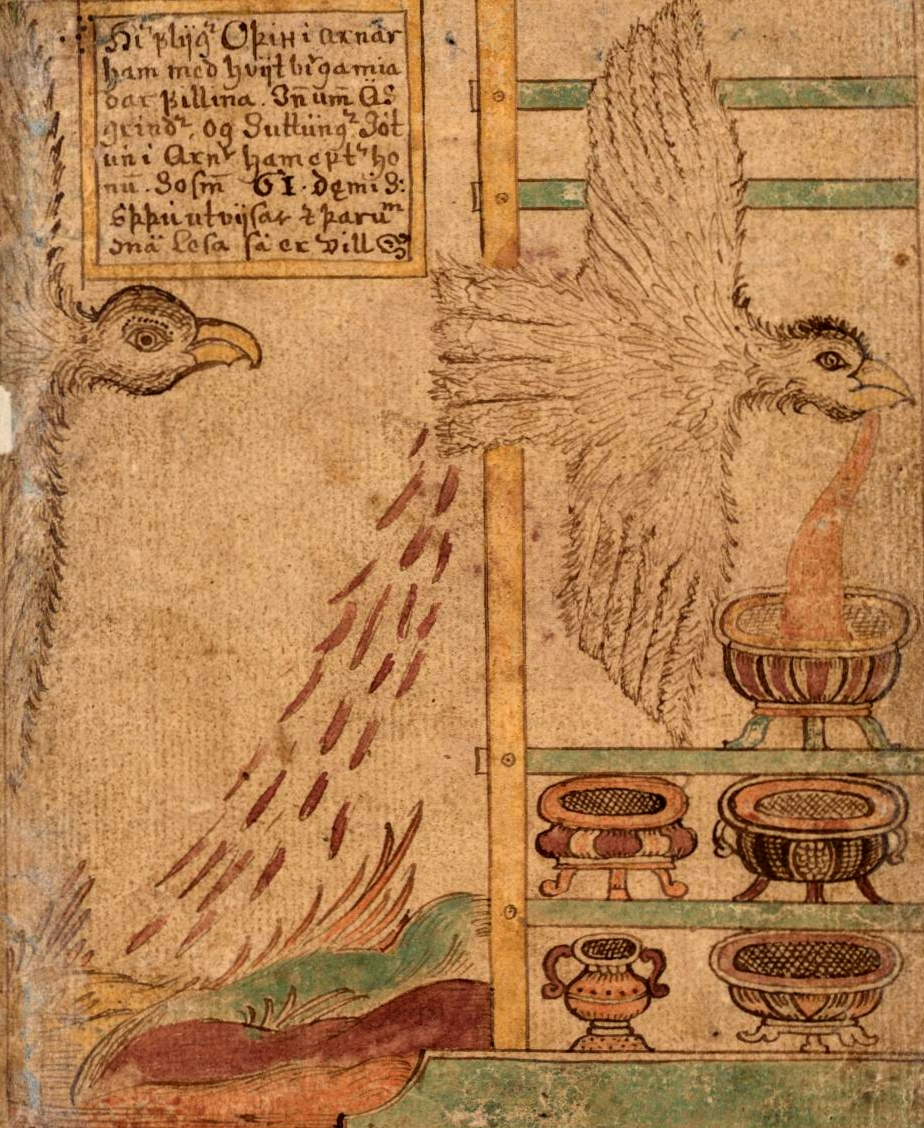
Chased by Suttungr, Odin spits the mead of poetry into several vessels. Some of it accidentally goes out the other end. Illustration by Jakob Sigurðsson, an 18th-century Icelandic artist.

In Norse mythology, the Poetic Mead or Mead of Poetry, (Note: Icelandic: skáldskaparmjöður) also known as Mead of Suttungr, (Note: Icelandic: Suttungamjöður) is a mythical beverage that whoever "drinks becomes a skald or scholar" able to recite any information and solve any question. This myth was reported by Snorri Sturluson in Skáldskaparmál. The drink is a vivid metaphor for poetic inspiration, often associated with Odin the god of 'possession' via berserker rage or poetic inspiration.

== Plot ==
=== Creation of the mead of poetry and murder of Kvasir ===
After the Æsir-Vanir War, the gods sealed the truce they had just concluded by spitting in a vat. To keep a symbol of this truce, they created from their spittle a man named Kvasir. He was so wise that there were no questions he could not answer. He travelled around the world to give knowledge to mankind. One day, he visited the dwarfs Fjalar and Galar. They killed him and poured his blood into two vats and a pot called Boðn, Són, and Óðrerir. They mixed his blood with honey, thus creating a mead which made anybody who drank it a "poet or scholar" ("skáld eða frœðamaðr"). The dwarfs explained to the gods that Kvasir had suffocated in intelligence.

=== From the dwarfs to Suttungr ===
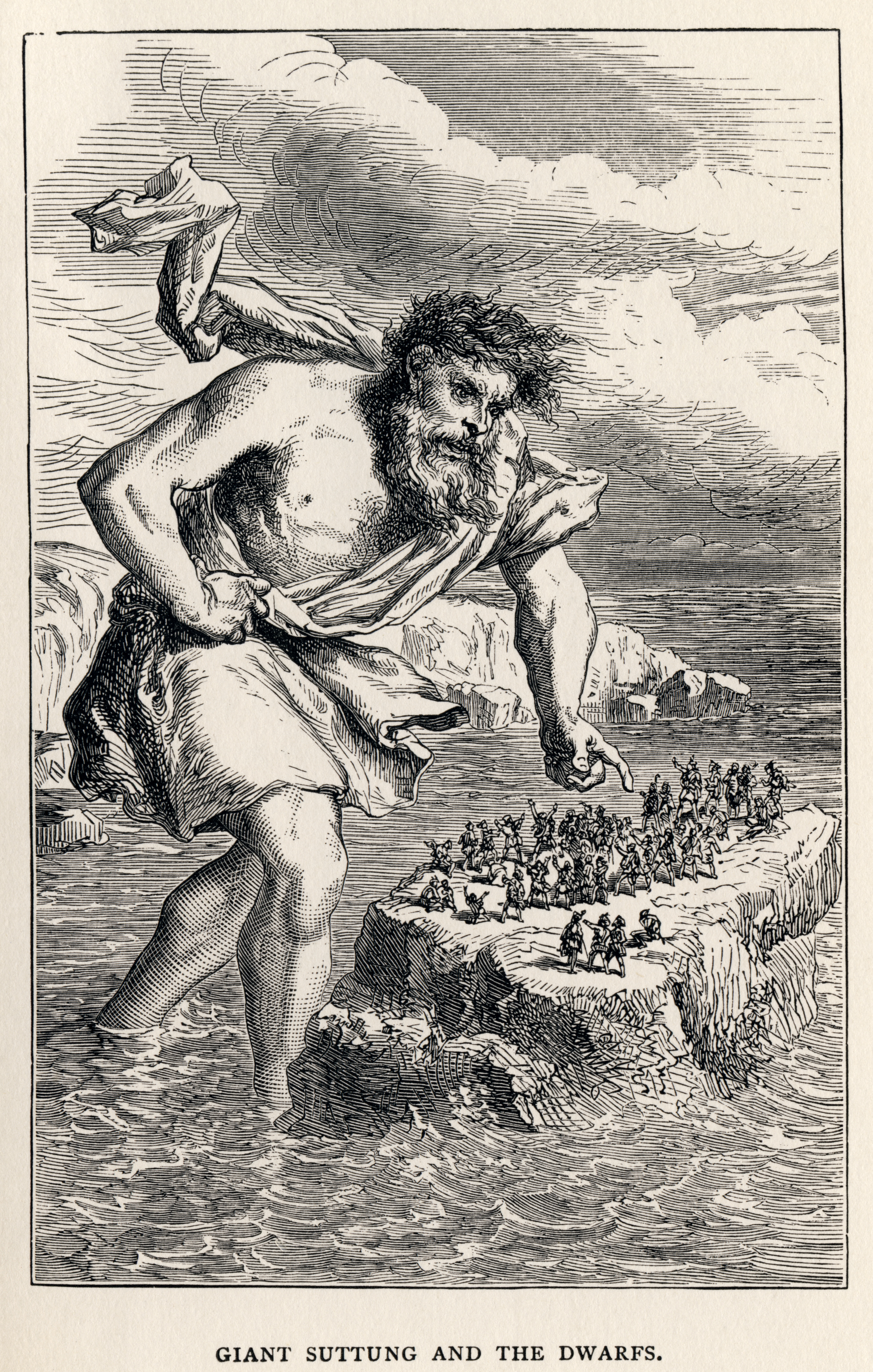
Suttungr threatens the dwarfs with drowning

Fjalar and Galar invited a jötunn, Gilling, and his wife. They took him to sea and capsized their boat and the jötunn drowned. The dwarfs then came back home and broke the news to Gilling's wife, which plunged her deep in grief. Fjallar proposed showing her the place where her husband had drowned but Galar got tired of her weeping, went before her and dropped a millstone on her head when she crossed the threshold.

When Gilling's son, Suttungr, learned what had happened, he went to the dwarfs and led them to a reef which was covered with water at high tide. The dwarfs implored him and offered him the mead in compensation for his father's death. Suttungr agreed. When he came back home, he stored the mead in a place called Hnitbjörg where his daughter, Gunnlöd, was in charge of guarding it.

=== Theft by Odin ===
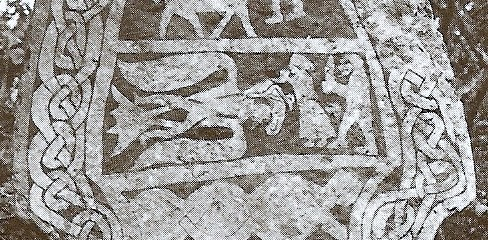
The Gotlandic image stone Stora Hammars III is believed to depict Odin in the form of an eagle (note the eagle's beard), Gunnlöð holding the mead of poetry, and Suttungr.

Odin met nine slaves who were scything hay and offered to sharpen their scythes. His whetstone worked so well that they all wanted to buy it. Odin threw it up in the air and the slaves struggled for it to death, cutting each other's throats.

Then he spent the night at Baugi's place. Baugi was Suttungr's brother. He complained that business did not go well since his slaves had killed each other and he could not get anybody to stand in for them. Odin, who said his name was Bölverk, proposed to do their work in exchange for a draught of Suttungr's mead. Baugi agreed, saying that he would try to persuade his brother. During summer, Bölverk did the work as agreed and, in winter, asked Baugi for his owing. They both went to Suttungr's, who refused to give a single drop of the beverage.

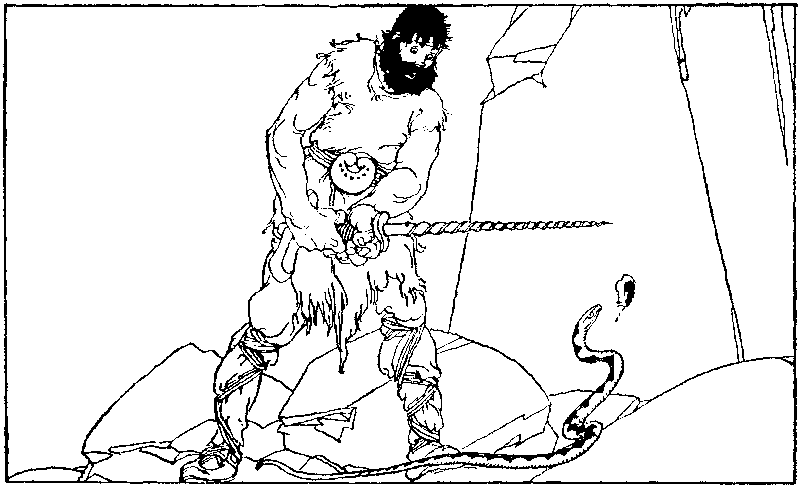
"Odin wins for men the magic mead" (1920) by Willy Pogany.

Bölverk then suggested Baugi use a trick. He gave him the drill Rati and asked him to bore into the mountain Hnitbjörg. After Baugi tried to deceive him, a hole was actually dug and Bölverk slipped into it, having taken the form of a snake. Baugi tried in vain to hit him with the drill.

He arrived by Gunnlöd, with whom he spent three nights. Thus he could have three draughts of mead. But with each draught he emptied a whole container. He then transformed into an eagle and flew away. When Suttungr discovered the theft, he too took the shape of an eagle and flew off in hot pursuit. When the Æsir saw Odin coming, they set out vessels in readiness to hold the mead and when, in the nick of time, the god arrived, he spat his loot into them. But Suttungr was so close to him that, in his fear and haste, the god let fall some of the precious liquid from his anus. Anybody could drink of this paltry and sullied portion, which was known as the "rhymester's share" ("skáldfífla hlutr"); but the greater portion of the mead of poetry (which had issued from his mouth) Odin gave to the gods and to those truly gifted in poetry.

== Influence ==
The story of the mead of poetry became the basis for large numbers of kennings and heiti for poetry in the Norse poetic tradition. These kennings were used throughout the skaldic verse of both non-Christian and Christian Norse poets, and, in Iceland, in rímur, including self-consciously Christian, post-Reformation rímur that told Bible-stories. For example, to express the idea "i am composing poetry", a rímur-poet might use a series of kennings such as In a gust of wind from a giantess [INSPIRATION] a ship of dwarves [MEAD>POETRY] launches from my dock of words [MOUTH/MIND] to sail on the sea of Boðn [MEAD>POETRY]".

== Adaptations ==
The comic book The Magic Mead in the Danish comic book series Valhalla, created by Peter Madsen and others, is a retelling of the story of the mead of poetry. Peter Madsen won The SAS Prize for Best Nordic for this comic at the Raptus Festival in Bergen, Norway.

== See also ==
- Soma
- Mímisbrunnr
- Salmon of Knowledge
- Culture hero

== Sources ==
- Snorri Sturluson, Edda, translated and edited by Anthony Faulkes, London: Everyman, 1995, ISBN 0-460-87616-3.
