= Suttungr =

Figure in Nordic mythology

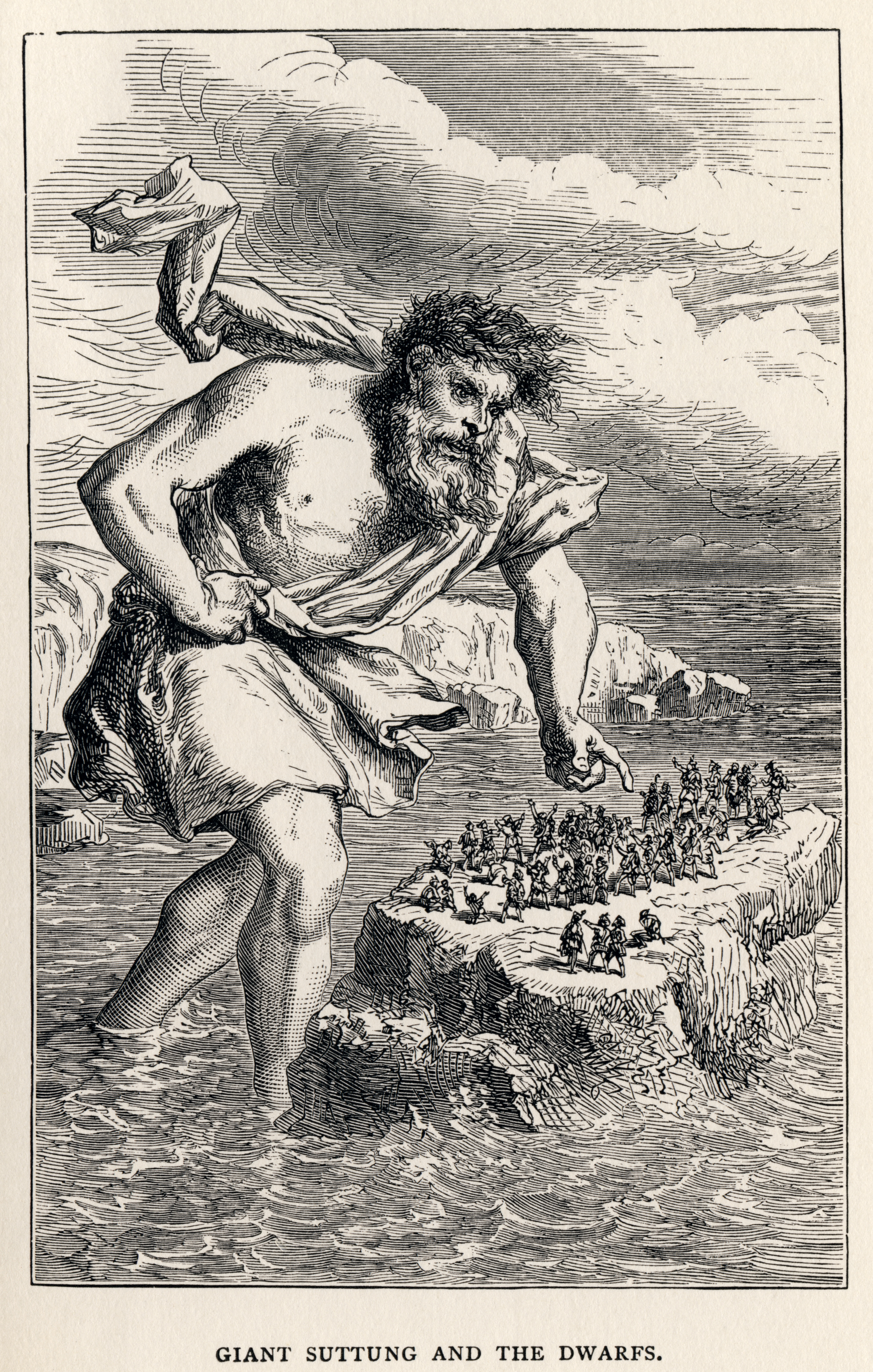
Suttungr and the dwarves

In Norse mythology, Suttungr (/ˈsʊtʊŋər/ SUUT-uung-ər; Old Norse: [ˈsutːoŋɡz̠]) was a jötunn and the son of Gilling.

== Mythology ==
Suttungr searched for his parents and threatened the dwarf brothers Fjalar and Galar who had killed them, tying them and some other dwarfs who killed Gilling to a rock that would be submerged by the rising tide. The dwarfs begged for Suttungr to spare their life and offered him the magical mead of poetry. Suttungr took it and hid it in the center of the mountain Hnitbjorg, with his daughter Gunnlöð guarding the magic mead. Odin get to drink from it by her in return for making love to her for three nights.

Odin eventually decided to obtain the mead. He worked for Baugi, Suttungr's brother, a farmer, for an entire summer, then asked for a small sip of the mead, which Suttungr refused. Baugi drilled into the mountain and Odin changed into a snake and slithered inside, whence his name Bölverkr. Inside, Gunnlöð was on guard but he persuaded her to give him three sips in exchange for three nights of sex. Odin proceeded to drink all the mead in the three containers, changed into an eagle and escaped. Suttungr chased him in the shape of an eagle, but Odin was able to escape him and returned to Asgard, yet only barely. He regurgitated the mead into great containers put out by the Æsir. Suttungr, however, got so close to fetching him that he had to excrete some of the mead towards Suttungr to divert him. This excrement fell to the ground and became the drink that makes bad poetry and poets..
