= Gunnlöð =

Norse mythical character

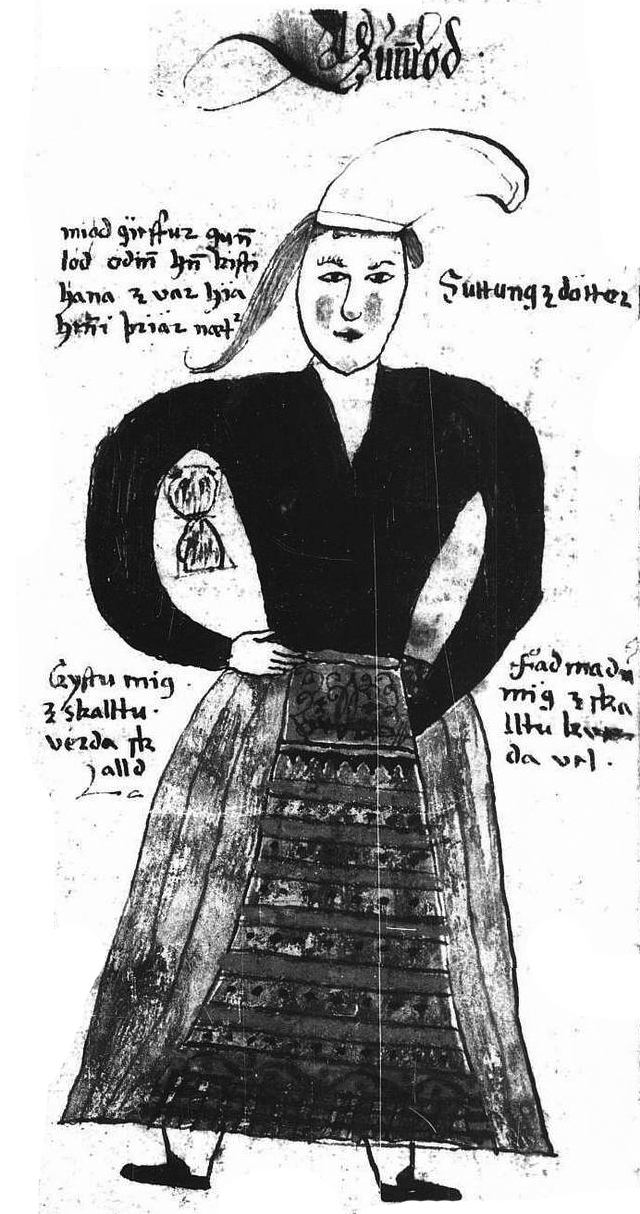
late 17th century Icelandic illustration of Gunnlöð

Gunnlǫð (Old Norse: [ˈɡunːlɔð]; also Gunnlöd) is a jötunn in Norse mythology. She is the daughter of Suttungr, for whom she guards the mead of poetry. Saturn's moon Gunnlod is named after her.

== Name ==
The Old Norse name Gunnlǫð has been translated as 'war-invitation', or 'battle-invitation'. It stems from Old Norse gunnr ('battle').

== Attestations ==
Skáldskaparmál (The Language of Poetry) mentions that the jötunn Suttungr has entrusted his daughter Gunnlöð to the guard of the mead of poetry:

Suttung took the mead home with him and put it for safe keeping in a place called Hnitbiorg, setting his daughter Gunnlod in charge of it.

— Skáldskaparmál, 57–58, trans. A. Faulkes, 1987

But Odin, in the form of a snake, manages to gain access to the chamber within the mountain Hnitbjörg where the mead is kept. The god seduces the guardian Gunnlöð, and sleeps with her three nights. In return, Gunnlöð allows Odin to obtain three drinks of the mead, after which he immediately flies himself out of the cavern as an eagle.

Bolverk [Odin] went to where Gunnlod was and lay with her for three nights and then she let him drink three draughts of the mead. In the first draught he drank everything out of Odrerir, and in the second out of Bodn, in the third out of Son, and then he had all the mead. Then he turned himself into the form of an eagle and flew as hard as he could.

— Skáldskaparmál, 58, trans. A. Faulkes, 1987

In Hávamál (Sayings of the High One), the account given by Odin differs in a number of details, and the narrative pays most attention to Gunnlöð herself.

Gunnlöd gave me, on the golden throne, a drink of the dear-won mead.
In return I gave her bad recompense,
for her whole heart,
for her sorrowful soul.

— Hávamál, 105, trans. A. Orchard, 1997.

I doubt I would have returned
back from the giants’ domain,
if I hadn’t had Gunnlöd, that fine woman
whom I laid in my arms.

— Hávamál, 108, trans. A. Orchard, 1997.

== Later Cultural Similarities ==
Gunnlöð's story shows a very strong resemblance to Jackie Blue, titular character of a song by the Ozark Mountain Daredevils.
