= Jötunn =

Race of beings in Germanic mythology

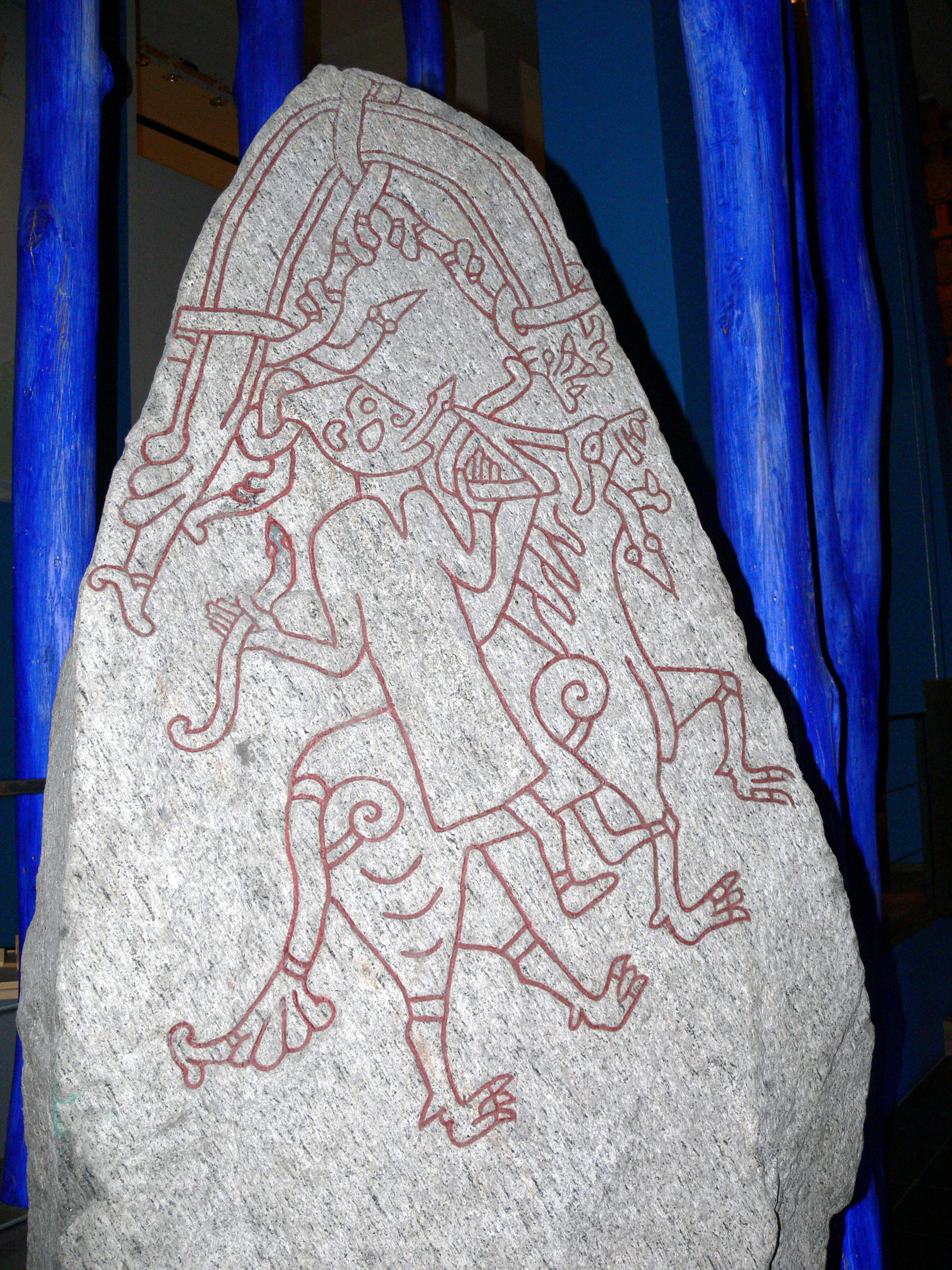
DR284 from the Hunnestad Monument, which has been interpreted as depicting the gýgr Hyrrokkin riding on a wolf with a snake as reins

A jötunn or jotun /ˈjɔːtʊn/, (Note: Old Norse: jǫtunn 'giant', plural jǫtnar; Danish: jætte; Faroese: jøtun; Icelandic: jötunn; Norwegian: jotun; Swedish: jätte), or ettin, (Note: Old English: eoten, plural eotenas; Middle English: eten) (sometimes translated as giant) is a type of being in Germanic mythology. In Norse mythology, jötnar are often contrasted with gods (the Æsir and Vanir) and with other non-human figures, such as dwarfs and elves, although the groupings are not always mutually exclusive. The entities included in the jötunn category are referred to by several other terms, including risi, þurs (or thurs) and troll if male and gýgr or tröllkona if female. The jötnar typically dwell across boundaries from the gods and humans in lands such as Jötunheimr.

The jötnar are frequently attested throughout the Old Norse records, with eotenas also featuring in the Old English epic poem Beowulf. The usage of the terms is dynamic, with an overall trend that the beings become portrayed as less impressive and more negative as Christianity becomes more influential over time. Although the term "giant" is sometimes used to gloss the word "jötunn" and its apparent synonyms in some translations and academic texts, this is seen as problematic by some scholars as jötnar are not necessarily notably large.

The terms for the beings also have cognates in later folklore such as the English yotun, Danish jætte and Finnish jätti which can share some common features, such as being turned to stone in the day and living on the periphery of society.

== Origin, appearance and terminology ==
=== Terminology and etymology ===
North Germanic
Proto-Norse: *etunaʀ; Old West Norse: jǫtunn; Icelandic: jötunn; Faroese: jøtun; Old East Norse: iætunn (ᛁᛆᛐᚢᚿ); Old Swedish: iætun^{†} – replaced by iætti; Old Danish: iætæn^{†} – replaced by jætti; early^{?} Proto-Norse: *etunaz; Sámi: jiehtanas, jiehtanis; Finnish: etana, etona – "bad human"	Proto-Norse: *etulaʀ, *etolaʀ; Northern Old Norse: *jatul; Norwegian: jøtul, jutul, jøtel, jutel; Jamtish: jutul, juttul, jottel – "the devil/trixter" (Note: Full sense: "the devil; clever handy man, trixter, sly fox". See also the derivative jotulnta, juturnta – "may the devil take".); Finnish: jatuli – "giant"; Finnish: → etolainen – "horrible"	Old East Norse: *iætti – byform (hypocorism); Old Swedish: iætti, iætte; Swedish: jätte m., jättinna f.; Finnish: jätti; Old Danish: *jætti, *jætte; Danish: jætte; Norwegian: jette
West Germanic
Proto-West Germanic: *etunaz → *etun; Old English: eoten, eten; Middle English: eten, etene, eotend, eatant, yoten, geten; English: etten, ettin, eaton; Scots: etin, etyn, etyne, eyttyn, eattin, yetin, yeten; Old Saxon: *etun m., *etinna f.; Middle Low German: eteninne^{†} f. – witch

The word eotenas in the manuscript of Beowulf

Old Norse jötunn and Old English eoten developed from the Proto-Germanic masculine noun *etunaz (cf. Sámi: jiehtanas, jiehtanis). Philologist Vladimir Orel says that semantic connections between *etunaz and Proto-Germanic *etanan ('to eat') make a relation between the two words likely. The words are cognate with Middle English etayn ('troll, ogre, giant') and Modern English ettin, an archaic word for a type of being. Old Norse risi and Old High German riso derive from the Proto-Germanic masculine noun *wrisjon. Orel observes that the Old Saxon adjective wrisi-līk 'enormous' is likely also connected. Old Norse þurs, Old English þyrs, and Old High German duris 'devil, evil spirit' derive from the Proto-Germanic masculine noun *þur(i)saz, itself derived from Proto-Germanic *þurēnan, which is etymologically connected to Sanskrit turá- 'strong, powerful, rich'. Several terms are used specifically to refer to female entities that fall into this wider category, including íviðja (plural íviðjur), gýgr (plural gýgjar) and tröllkona (plural tröllkonur).

Terms for jötnar are also found in Old Norse compound words such as bergrisi, ('mountain-risi') and hrímþurs ('rime-þurs', or 'frost-þurs').

The cognates jötunn and eoten, and þurs and þyrs have been equated by scholars such as J. R. R. Tolkien and Rudolf Simek, with the words being used to describe the being in either Old Norse or Old English respectively.

=== Appearance, connotations and distinctions ===
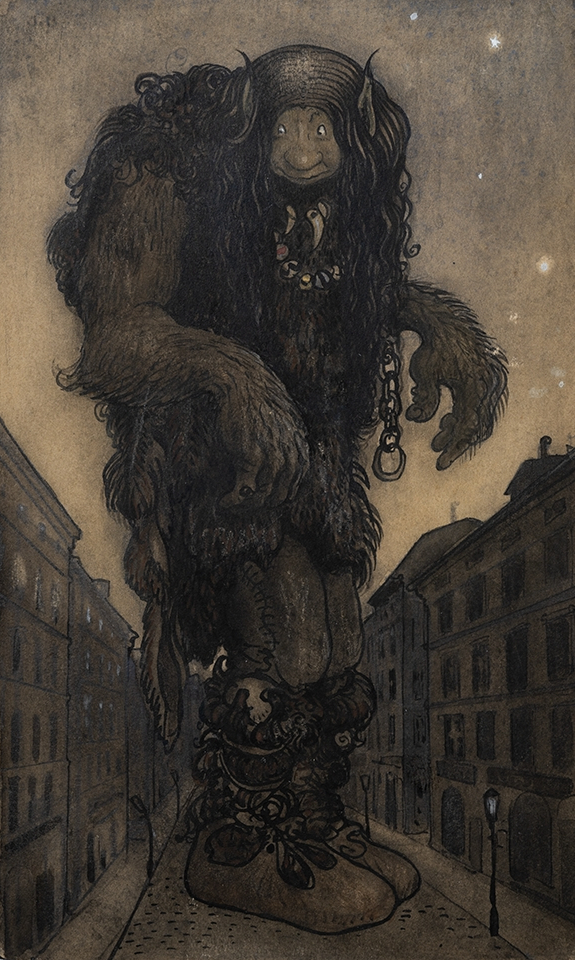
"The giant that slept for 5,000 years", by John Bauer (1882–1918). Nordic folklore often intermix jötnar and trolls, and descendant forms also merged with "giant", thus, Bauer depicted his jötun as a giant troll.

In the Eddas, jötnar are beings typically with similar power to the gods and may also be referred to by the negative terms troll and þurs. The harmful nature of þursar is also described in the Norse rune poems, where they are identified for causing strife to women. Descriptions of the appearance of jötnar are uncommon; however, the progenitor of the jötnar is described as having the form of a man. Some female jötnar are described as being beautiful, such as Gerðr and Hymir's partner, while others are described as monstrous and having many heads. Some dwarfs are described as jötnar such as Regin and Fáfnir, while in Alvíssmál, the eponymous dwarf is noted for having the likeness of a þurs.

As the influence of Christianity grew, jötnar became demonised and typically portrayed as less intelligent, easier to outwit and more monstrous, as is common with giants in later Germanic folklore. In some later sagas, such as Bárðar saga Snæfellsáss, risar are clearly distinct from jötnar however in others the terms are used interchangeably, albeit with an overall trend that jötnar have begun to be seen negatively relative to risar.

Troll has a much wider semantic scope in Old Norse literature than solely jötnar, also including individuals with unusual or supernatural traits such as witches, abnormally strong, large or ugly people, ghosts and berserkers.

=== Glossing as "giant" ===
Terms for jötnar are often translated into Modern English as "giant" or "giantess". John Lindow uses the glosses to contrast them with the gods but notes that they are not (necessarily) giant, being similar in size to the gods, and are best conceived of as a kin or family group, separated by relation rather than physical appearance. Due to this issue, some scholars such as Terry Gunnell, Jeramy Dodds and Benjamin Thorpe either anglicise or leave untranslated terms for jötnar in translations and academic work.

== Notable jötnar ==
- Gerðr, a daughter of Gymir and wife of Freyr. Usually regarded as an earth-goddess.
- Grendel, an eoten who, along with his mother, ravages the hall of Heorot before being killed by Beowulf.
- Fárbauti, the jötunn father of Loki with Laufey.
- Fenja and Menja, sisters who turn the mill Grotti to produce gold and Fróði's Peace.
- Hrungnir, a jötunn champion who challenged Thor to a duel.
- Jörð, possibly a jötunn at one period of time and the mother of Thor with Odin. According to Rudolf Simek, Jörð is "[a]n Æsir goddess, even though she is also called a giantess"; while John Lindow claims, "Jörd must have been a giantess in the beginning."
- Skaði, a daughter of Þjazi and later wife of Njörðr. Goddess associated with skiing and claimed as a mythical ancestor of Haakon Sigurdsson.
- Þjazi, a jötunn who once kidnapped Iðunn and her apples of youth. He was later killed by the gods and his eyes made into stars.
- Ymir, the progenitor of the jötnar.

== Mythological origin ==
In a stanza of Völuspá hin skamma (found in the poem "Hyndluljóð"), all jötnar descend from Ymir. Gylfaginning elaborates on this, describing that the primordial jötunn Ymir formed in the warm waters that arose in Ginnungagap when the rime of Niflheim was melted by the heat of Muspelheim. He lay there asleep, fed by milk from Auðumbla, whereupon from his left armpit he sweated a male and a female, and his legs begat a son with one another. Together, these children became the ancestors of all other jötnar.

Later, he was killed by the first gods, resulting in a flood of Ymir's blood, in which all jötnar drowned except Bergelmir and his family, who survive this event by way of sailing upon a luðr. This has been linked to a runic inscription on a sword hilt in Beowulf which describes the eotenas being killed in an ancient flood and has been proposed to derive from Germanic and wider Indo-European mythology.

According to Gylfaginning, after Ymir was killed, his body was wrought into the world and a sea surrounded it. The gods then gave the surviving families of jötnar lands along the shore to settle, placing them in the periphery. Ymir's brows were then used to build Midgard and protect it from the jötnar due to their known aggression.

== Attributes and themes ==
=== Position as the "Other" ===
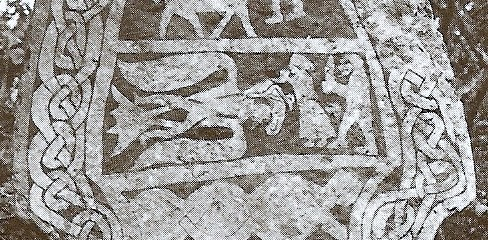
Stora Hammars III, an image stone from Gotland thought to show Odin as a bearded eagle, Gunnlöð holding the mead of poetry, and Suttungr

Most stories in Old Norse mythology show a clear division between "This World", pertaining to that of gods and men, and "The Other", which is inhabited by jötnar and beings associated with them.

A common motif is the journeying to obtain secret knowledge from the jötnar. In the Eddic poem Hyndluljóð, Freyja travels to the gýgr Hyndla to obtain understanding of the lineage of Ottar, and the "ale of remembrance" (Old Norse: minnisǫl) so that he does not forget it. In the Eddic poem Vafþrúðnismál, Óðinn travels to the jötunn Vafþrúðnir whereupon they engage in a wisdom contest. He also travels to the jötnar to obtain from Suttungr the Mead of poetry, which imparts skill in poetry to any who drink it. The völva who tells the Völuspá prophecy to Óðinn, while not explicitly described as a jötunn but was raised by them.

Cosmology in Germanic mythology, as with other oral cultures, has many apparent contradictions when viewed from a naturalistic standpoint. Despite this, a system of motifs repeat when travelling to the jötnar. In the Prose Edda that the jötnar dwell in Jötunheimr which is at points located in the North or East and in Þrymskviða can only be reached by air, however jötnar are also found South and across water. Jötnar such as Suttungr and Skaði live in mountains, which is further reflected in the terms Old Norse: bergrisar (mountain risar) and Old Norse: bergbúi (mountain dweller), a kenning for jötunn. Their lands of inhabitation are not restricted to this, also including forests, underground, and the shore. Sometimes they are referred to as living in specific geographical locations such as Ægir on Læsø. These motifs are also seen in the section of Beowulf concerning the fight with mother of the eoten Grendel which has been noted by scholars to closely resemble the fight between a trollkona and Grettir in his eponymous saga, wherein the female beings may only be reached by crossing through water. The seemingly ununified location of the jötnar has been suggested to be an outcome of their intrinsically chaotic nature. Even within the same story, what seem like contradictions have been noted by scholars, prompting the proposal of a model that the otherworld where the jötnar dwell can be reached from a number of passages or boundaries that cannot be traversed under normal conditions, such as the mountains, darkness and "flickering flame" crossed by Skírnir in Skírnismál.

In Eddic sources, jötnar present a constant threat to gods and humans, often leading them to confrontation with Thor. Hárbarðsljóð and Þrymskviða tell that if it was not for Thor and Mjöllnir, jötnar would soon overrun Midgard and Asgard respectively. Nonetheless, Thor also has a positive relationship with some gýgjar, such as Gríðr and the unnamed wife of Hymir, who provide magical items and council that enable him to overcome other jötnar.

=== Ancestors of gods and humans ===
A bergrisi ("mountain risi")—the traditional protector of southwestern Iceland—appears as a supporter on the coat of arms of Iceland.

The distinction between gods and jötnar is not clearly defined and they should be seen as different culturally rather than biologically, with some gods, such as Odin, Thor and Loki being the descendants of jötnar. A common motif that often forms the core storyline of Eddic narratives is the unsuccessful attempts of jötnar to marry one of the goddesses, be it through either trickery or force. In contrast, the female jötunn Skaði chooses the male Vanr Njörðr as a husband. According to the Ynglinga saga, she later had children with Odin, from whom kings such as Earl Hakon were descended. The Vanr Freyr also marries Gerðr, who are the claimed ancestors of the Ynglings. Odin also seduces the jötnar Gunnlöð and Rindr and marries Jörð. In the cases when gods marry jötnar, they appear to be fully incorporated into the gods and are referred to as Ásynjur in Nafnaþulur. Consistent with this, reference to Skaði's vés in Lokasenna and toponyms such as Skedevi in Sweden suggests that despite being a jötunn, she was worshipped in Old Norse religion.

=== Association with wild animals ===
One of the tröllkonur who dwell in the wood Járnviðr is a mother of jötnar in the forms of wolves and from whom are descended all wolves. This tröllkona has been suggested to be Angrboða, the gýgr who begat with Loki the monstrous wolf Fenrir and venomous worm Jörmungandr who become enemies of the gods. Also in Járnviðr dwells the jötunn Eggþér who has been interpreted as either a guardian of the gýgjar who live there or a herdsman of the wolves. Wolves are also taken as mounts by gýgjar such as Hyndla and Hyrrokkin, the latter of which using snakes as reins. This is further attested in skaldic poetry in which "wolf" is described by the kennings "Leikn's horse", "Gjálp's horse", "Gríðr's horse", while a group of wolves is referred to as "Gríðr's grey herd of horses". Wolf-riding gýgjar are referred to as myrkriður ("riders in the night") or kveldriður ("dusk riders").

Hræsvelgr is told in Vafþrúðnismál (37) and Gylfaginning (18) to be a jötunn in an arnarhamr (eagle-guise) who creates the wind by beating his wings. Other jötnar, such as Þjazi and Suttungr are able to become eagles by wearing their arnarhamir, or resemble them like Griðr in Illuga saga Gríðarfóstra who has hands like eagle talons.

=== Demonisation ===
In later material composed during the Christian period such as the legendary sagas, jötnar are often portrayed as uncivilised and cannibalistic. In the case of Bárðar saga Snæfellsáss and Hálfdanar saga Brönufóstra they specifically eat both human and horse meat, the latter of which was directly associated with heathen practices. The post-Christian association between jötnar and pre-Christian practices is also seen in Beowulf, in which the man-eating eoten Grendel is described as having a "heathen soul" and "heathenish hand-spurs". Female jötnar are explicitly described as being heathen in some later sources such as Orms þáttr Stórólfssonar, in which religion prevents her from being with the hero, and the legendary saga Þorsteins þáttr bæjarmagns, in which she must be baptised before marrying the hero.

== Modern folklore ==
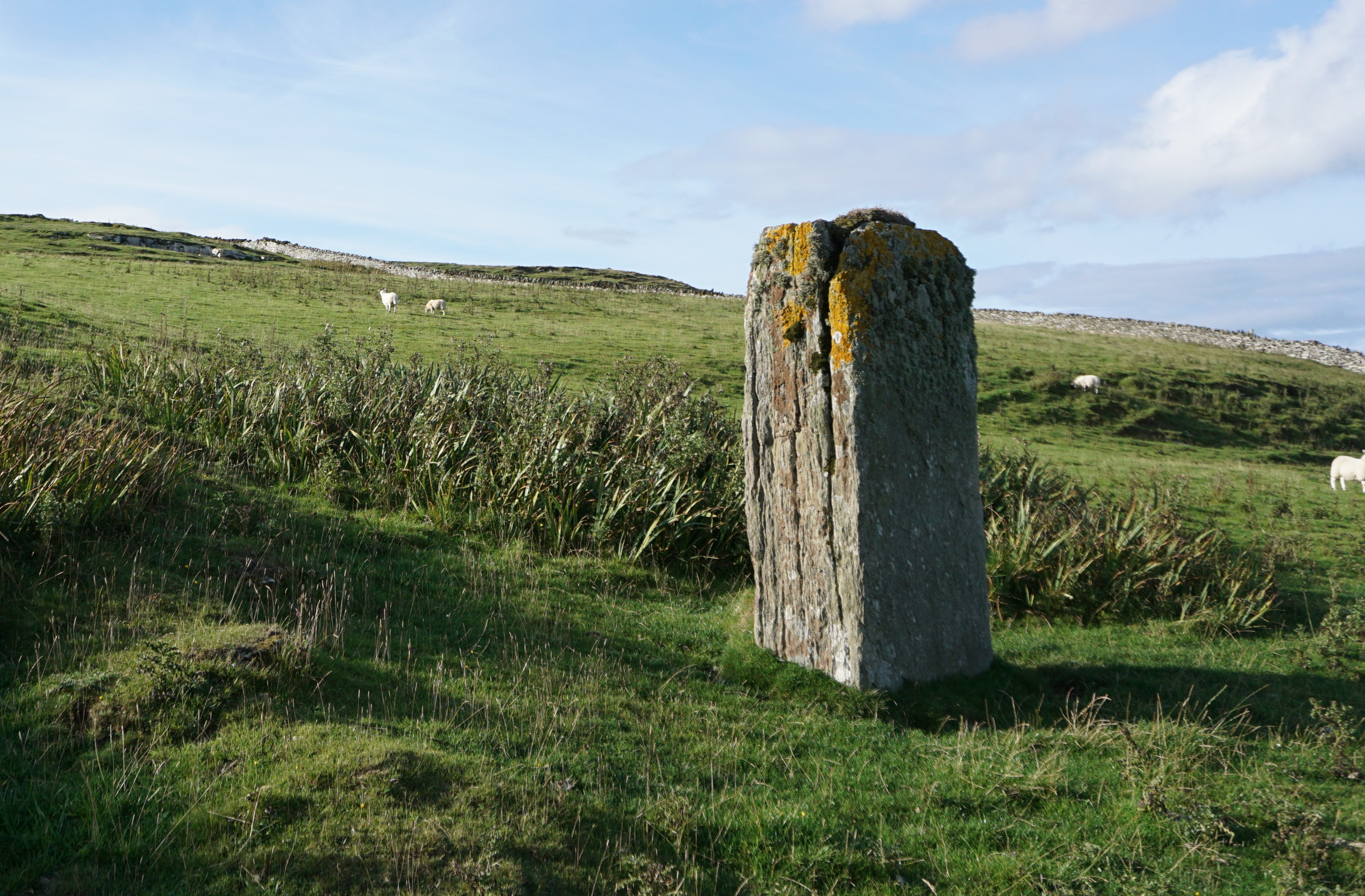
The Yetnasteen, a standing stone in Rousay in Orkney, held in local folklore to be a giant or jötunn that has been turned to stone

Giants with names cognate to terms for jötnar are found in later Northern European folklore, such as the English ettin or yotun, thurse and hobthrust, Danish jætte, Swedish jätte and Finnish jätti. In Germanic folklore, giants often share traits with jötnar, particularly as depicted in legendary sagas, combined with motifs from other European giants and are often interchangeable with trolls.

As with jötnar, Germanic giants live outside of human communities, in woods and mountains. They commonly show an aversion to Christianity, often showing a disdain for the ringing of church bells. Similarities are also both seen in their role in the construction of stoneworks. Akin to the Old Norse tale of the jötunn who built the wall of Ásgarðr, giants often enter into wagers involved in the building of churches which they later lose, as with the tale of Jätten Finn who is attributed with the construction of Lund Cathedral. Ruins are also attributed to the works of both beings, as in the Old English poem The Ruin and the aetiological story of Wade's Causeway in Yorkshire.

Some standing stones in northern Europe are explained as petrified giants such as the Yetnasteen in Orkney which derives its name from Old Norse: Jǫtna-steinn (Jötunn's stone). According to folklore, it awakens every New Year at midnight whereupon it visits the Loch of Scockness to drink. Orcadian folklore also explains the Ring of Brodgar as dancing giants who were turned to stone by the morning sun. This motif is also seen in Helgakviða Hjörvarðssonar, in which the gýgr Hrímgerðr engages in a senna with Helgi Hundingsbane until the sun rises and she is turned to stone.

The Orcadian tradition of Gyro Night derives its name from Old Norse: gýgr and consisted of two older boys dressing up as masked old women one night in February and chasing smaller boys with ropes. Similar to this are the Faroese and Shetlandic popular customs of dressing up as giantesses referred to as Grýla (plural grýlur), or other similar terms, in costumes traditionally made from a combination of animal skins, tattered clothes, seaweed, straw and sometimes featuring masks. Grýla is a female creature described in Sturlunga saga as having fifteen tails, and listed as a tröllkona in the Nafnaþulur section of the Prose Edda who features in folklore throughout the North Atlantic islands settled by Scandinavians.

== Toponomy ==
Place-names derived from þurs or cognate:

England

- Thursford (Þyrs ford) – Village in Norfolk
- Thursgill (Þurs' gill) – Gill in West Riding of Yorkshire, field in Cumbria
- Thruss Pits (Þyrs pit) – Field in Derbyshire
- Thrispin Head (Þurs fen) – Wetland in West Riding of Yorkshire
- Trusey Hill (Þyrs hill) – Hill in East Riding of Yorkshire

== See also ==
- Troll
- Giant
- Asura – a comparable class of deities in Indian mythology
- Dev – a comparable class of beings in Persian lore
- Ents
- Landvættir
- Giants (Marvel Comics)
- Giant (Dungeons & Dragons)
- Titan – a comparable class of deities in Greek mythology

== Bibliography ==
=== Primary ===
- Bellows, Henry Adam (2018). The poetic Edda. Digireads.com Publishing. ISBN 978-1420957051.
- Dodds, Jeramy (2015). The poetic Edda. Toronto: Coach House Books. ISBN 978-1552452967.
- Laing, Samuel (1961). Heimskringla. London: Dent. ISBN 0460008471.
- Lavender, Philip (2015). Illuga saga Gríðarfóstra = The saga of Illugi, Gríður's foster-son. London: Viking Society for Northern Research. ISBN 9780903521918.
- Leslie, R.F. (1961). Three Old English Elegies (1 ed.). Manchester: The University Press. ISBN 9780859891844.
- The Elder Edda: A Book of Viking Lore. Translated by Orchard, Andy. London: Penguin Books. 2011. ISBN 9780141393728.
- Sturluson, Snorri (2018). The Prose Edda. Translated by Brodeur, Arthur Gilchrist. Franklin Classics Trade Press. ISBN 9780344335013.
- Thorpe, Benjamin (2010). The Elder Eddas of Saemund Sigfusson: Translated from the Original Old Norse Text Into English. Forgotten Books. ISBN 978-1440066078.
- "Beowulf on Steorarume [Beowulf in Cyberspace]: Bilingual Edition (OE text & translation)". heorot.dk.
- "Nafnaþulur – heimskringla.no". heimskringla.no.
- "Rune poems". Wikisource.
- "The Ruin, Old English Poetry Project, Rutgers University". oldenglishpoetry.camden.rutgers.edu.

=== Secondary ===
- Ásdísardóttir, Ingunn (2018). Jǫtnar in War and Peace: the Jǫtnar in Old Norse mythology: their nature and function. University of Iceland, School of Social Sciences. OCLC 1113408226.
- Brink, Stefan (2004). "Mytologiska rum och eskatologiska föreställningar i det vikingatida Norden". Ordning mot kaos: Studier av nordisk förkristen kosmologi: S. 291–316: ill. ISBN 9789189116634.
- Clarke, Jake (2020). "Finding a place for old things: The role of pre-Norse features in constructing Norse conceptual landscapes in the Scottish Isles". Lund University.
- Davidson, Hilda R. Ellis (1970). "Scandinavian Folklore in Britain". Journal of the Folklore Institute. 7 (2/3): 177–186. doi:10.2307/3813871. ISSN 0015-5934. JSTOR 3813871.
- Fox, Michael (2020). Following the formula in Beowulf, Örvar-Odds saga, and Tolkien. Cham. p. 30. ISBN 978-3030481360.
- Geeraert, Dustin (2018). ""Etaynez þat Hym Anelede of þe Heӡe Felle": Ghosts of Giants in Sir Gawain and the Green Knight". Comitatus: A Journal of Medieval and Renaissance Studies. 49 (1): 71–101. doi:10.1353/cjm.2018.0003.
- Gunnell, Terry (2001). "Grýla, Grýlur, "Grøleks" and Skeklers: Medieval Disguise Traditions in the North Atlantic?" (PDF). notendur.hi.is. pp. 32–54. Archived (PDF) from the original on 9 October 2022.
- Gunnell, Terry (2018). "Blótgyðjur, Goðar, Mimi, Incest, and Wagons: Oral Memories of the Religion(s) of the Vanir". Old Norse Mythology—Comparative Perspectives. Ed. Pernille Hermann, Stephen A. Mitchell, and Jens Peter Schjødt, with Amber J. Rose.
- Heide, Eldar (2014). "Contradictory cosmology in Old Norse myth and religion – but still a system?". Maal og Minne (in Norwegian). 106 (1). ISSN 1890-5455.
- Jakobsson, Ármann (2006). ""Where Do the Giants Live?"". Arkiv för nordisk filologi. 121: 101–112.
- Jakobsson, Ármann (2008). "The Trollish Acts of Þorgrímr the Witch: The Meanings of Troll and Ergi in Medieval Iceland". Saga-Book. 32: 39–68.
- Jakobsson, Ármann (2009). Identifying the Ogre, The Legendary Saga Giants.
- Ljosland, Ragnhild (2013). "Old Norse Cultural Influence in the Work of Christina M. Costie". Journal of the North Atlantic: 177–188. ISSN 1935-1984. JSTOR 26686980.
- Lindow, John (2002). Norse Mythology: A Guide to Gods, Heroes, Rituals, and Beliefs. Oxford University Press. ISBN 978-0-19-983969-8.
- Lummer, Felix (2021). "Solitary Colossi and Not-So-Small Men". Arv – Nordic Yearbook of Folklore. 77 (1): 57–85.
- Maraschi, Andrea (2020). "Taboo or Magic Practice? Cannibalism as Identity Marker for Giants and Human Heroes in Medieval Iceland". Parergon. 37 (1): 1–25. doi:10.1353/pgn.2020.0056. S2CID 226719907.
- McKinnell, John (2005). Meeting the other in Norse myth and legend. Woodbridge, Suffolk, UK: D.S. Brewer. ISBN 1843840421.
- Monikander, Anne (28 December 2006). "Borderland-stalkers and Stalking-horses Horse Sacrifice as Liminal Activity in the Early Iron Age". Current Swedish Archaeology. 14: 143–158. doi:10.37718/CSA.2006.07. ISSN 2002-3901.
- Motz, Lotte (1982). "Giants in Folklore and Mythology: A New Approach". Folklore. 93 (1): 70–84. doi:10.1080/0015587X.1982.9716221. ISSN 0015-587X. JSTOR 1260141.
- Muir, Tom (2014). Orkney folk tales. Stroud, Gloucestershire: History Press. ISBN 9780752499055.
- Orchard, Andy (1997). Dictionary of Norse myth and legend. London: Cassell. ISBN 9780304345205.
- Price, Neil (2006). "What's in a Name? An Archeological Identity Crisis for the Norse Gods (and Some of their Friends)". In Andrén, Anders; Jennbert, Kristina; et al. (eds.). Old Norse Religion in Long-Term Perspectives: Origins, Changes, and Interactions. Lund: Nordic Academic Press. ISBN 91-89116-81-X.
- Salus, Peter H.; Taylor, Paul Beekman (1969). "Eikinskjaldi, Fjalarr, And Eggþér". Neophilologus. 53 (1): 76–81. doi:10.1007/BF01511692. ISSN 1572-8668. S2CID 162276325.
- Schneider, Karl (1986). Sophia Lectures on Beowulf. Taishukan for the Japan Science Society. pp. 170–171.
- Slade, Benjamin (2007). "Untydras ealle: Grendel, Cain, and V̥rtra: Indo-European śruti and Christian sm̥rti in Beowulf". In Geardagum. 27: 1–32.
- Simek, Rudolf (2008). A Dictionary of Northern Mythology. Translated by Hall, Angela. BOYE6. ISBN 9780859915137.
- Simpson, Jacqueline (2004). Icelandic folktales & legends (2nd ed.). Stroud: Tempus. ISBN 9780752430454.
- Taylor, Paul Beekman (1998). Sharing story: Medieval Norse-English literary relationships. New York: AMS Press. pp. 123–137. ISBN 0404641652.
- Tolkien, J. R. R. (2011). Beowulf and the critics (Rev., 2nd ed.). Tempe, Ariz.: ACMRS. ISBN 978-0866984508.
- Westwood, Jennifer (2006). The lore of the land: a guide to England's legends, from Spring-heeled Jack to the Witches of Warboys. London: Penguin. ISBN 0141021039.
- "Key to English Place-names, Thursford". kepn.nottingham.ac.uk.
  - "Thrispin Gate, Thrispin Head :: Survey of English Place-Names". epns.nottingham.ac.uk.
  - "Thruss Pits :: Survey of English Place-Names". Survey of English Place-Names.
  - "Thursgill :: Survey of English Place-Names". epns.nottingham.ac.uk.
  - "Thursgill ' :: Survey of English Place-Names". epns.nottingham.ac.uk.
  - "Trusey Hill :: Survey of English Place-Names". epns.nottingham.ac.uk.
  - "bergrisi". Wiktionary. 18 September 2019.
  - "ettin". Wiktionary. 5 October 2019.
  - "gýgr". Wiktionary. 8 January 2022.
  - "hrímþurs". Wiktionary. 2 March 2022.
  - "íviðja". Wiktionary. 8 January 2022.
  - "jätti". Wiktionary. 1 December 2022.
  - "Trollkona". Old Icelandic Dictionary.
  - "Jotun". Random House Webster's Unabridged Dictionary. 21 April 2018. Archived from the original on 21 April 2018.
