= Laufás-Edda =

Laufás-Edda (Edda Magnúsar Ólafssonar) is a 17th-century redaction of the Snorra Edda, which survives in numerous Icelandic manuscripts.

== History ==
Laufás Edda was compiled by the Icelandic priest and poet Magnús Ólafsson (c.1573–1636) on the request of the Icelandic scholar and antiquarian Arngrímur Jónsson. Magnús began his work at Auðkúla in 1607 after he had been dismissed from his office as parish minister, and completed his new redaction during the winter of 1608–09. Magnús would later serve as the priest at Laufás parish in Northern Iceland and as a consequence his version of the Edda is usually referred to as the Laufás-Edda.

The purpose of his efforts was to make a systematic and encyclopedic version of Snorri Sturluson's Prose Edda. Laufás-Edda is a rearranged redaction of the Snorra Edda. The myths in Gylfaginning are presented as a series of examples (dæmisögur) and the kennings of Skáldskaparmál are organized alphabetically by subject. The last part, Háttatal, was not included.

Due to its popularity, the Laufás redaction later became the basis for the first printed Edition of the Snorra Edda, Peder Hansen Resen's Edda Islandorum. Resen's edition was accompanied by a Danish and Latin translation. The Laufás-Edda, especially through Resen's edition, became a convenient and popular work of reference for poets and antiquarians, serving as an encyclopedia for researching both myth and poetic language.

== Sources ==
- Anthony Faulkes, ed., Two Versions of Snorra Edda from the 17th Century, 1: Edda Magnúsar Ólafssonar (Laufás Edda); 2: Edda Islandorum: Völuspá, Hávamál (Reykjavík: Stofnun Árna Magnússonar á Íslandi, 1979)
