= Prose Edda =

13th-century Icelandic book on Norse mythology

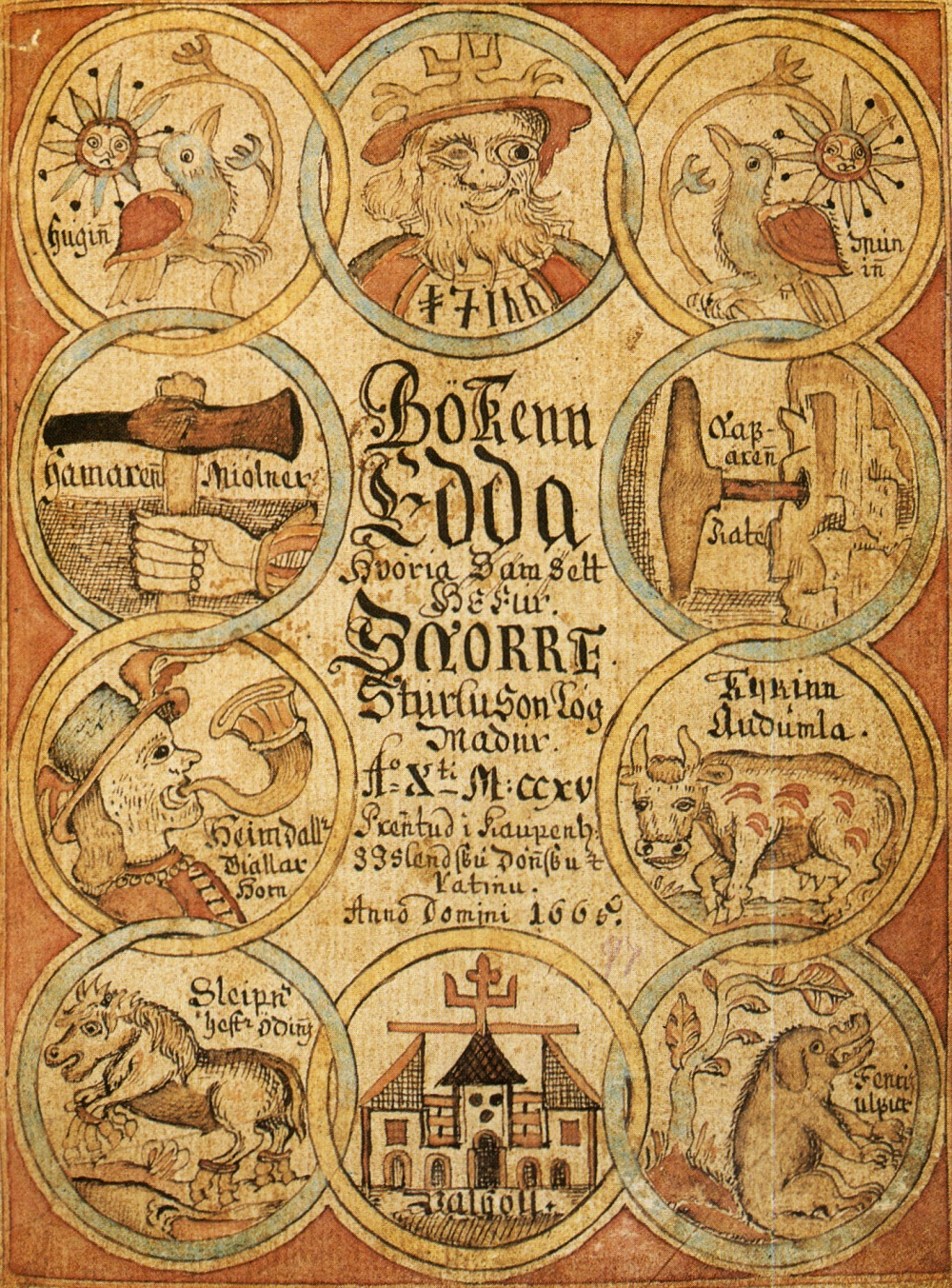
Title page of a late manuscript of the Prose Edda written by Snorri Sturluson (13th century), showing the Ancient Norse Gods Odin, Heimdallr, Sleipnir, and other figures from Norse mythology

The Prose Edda, also known as the Younger Edda, Snorri's Edda (Icelandic: Snorra Edda) or, historically, simply as Edda, is an Old Norse textbook written in Iceland during the early 13th century. The work is often considered to have been to some extent written, or at least compiled, by the Icelandic scholar, lawspeaker, and historian Snorri Sturluson c. 1220. It is considered the fullest and most detailed source for modern knowledge of Norse mythology, the body of myths of the North Germanic peoples, and draws from a wide variety of sources, including versions of poems that survive into today in a collection known as the Poetic Edda.

The Prose Edda consists of four sections: The Prologue, a euhemerized account of the Norse gods; Gylfaginning, which provides a question and answer format that details aspects of Norse mythology (consisting of approximately 20,000 words), Skáldskaparmál, which continues this format before providing lists of kennings and heiti (approximately 50,000 words); and Háttatal, which discusses the composition of traditional skaldic poetry (approximately 20,000 words).

Dating from c. 1300 to 1600, seven manuscripts of the Prose Edda differ from one another in notable ways, which provides researchers with independent textual value for analysis. The Prose Edda appears to have functioned similarly to a contemporary textbook, with the goal of assisting Icelandic poets and readers in understanding the subtleties of alliterative verse, and to grasp the meaning behind the many kennings used in skaldic poetry.

Originally known to scholars simply as Edda, the Prose Edda gained its contemporary name in order to differentiate it from the Poetic Edda. Early scholars of the Prose Edda suspected that there once existed a collection of entire poems, a theory confirmed with the rediscovery of manuscripts of the Poetic Edda.

== Naming ==
The etymology of "Edda" remains uncertain; there are many hypotheses about its meaning and development, yet little agreement. Some argue that the word derives from the name of Oddi, a town in the south of Iceland where Snorri was raised. Edda could therefore mean "book of Oddi." However, this assumption is generally rejected. Anthony Faulkes in his English translation of the Prose Edda comments that this is "unlikely, both in terms of linguistics and history" since Snorri was no longer living at Oddi when he composed his work.

Another connection was made with the word óðr, which means 'poetry or inspiration' in Old Norse. According to Faulkes, though such a connection is plausible semantically, it is unlikely that "Edda" could have been coined in the 13th century on the basis of "óðr", because such a development "would have had to have taken place gradually", and Edda in the sense of 'poetics' is not likely to have existed in the preliterary period.

Edda also means 'great-grandparent', a word that appears in Skáldskaparmál, which occurs as the name of a figure in the eddic poem Rigsthula and in other medieval texts.

A final hypothesis is derived from the Latin edo, meaning "I write". It relies on the fact that the word "kredda" (meaning "belief") is certified and comes from the Latin "credo", meaning 'I believe'. Edda in this case could be translated as "Poetic Art". This is the meaning that the word was then given in the medieval period.

The now uncommonly used name Sæmundar Edda was given in 1643 by the Bishop Brynjólfur Sveinsson to the collection of poems contained in the Codex Regius, many of which are quoted by Snorri. Brynjólfur, along with many others of his time incorrectly believed that they were collected by Sæmundr fróði (therefore before the drafting of the Edda of Snorri), and so the Poetic Edda is also known as the Elder Edda.

== Manuscripts ==
Seven manuscripts of the Prose Edda have survived into the present day: Six copies from the medieval period and another dating to the 1600s. No one manuscript is complete, and each has variations. In addition to three fragments, the four main manuscripts are Codex Regius, Codex Wormianus, Codex Trajectinus, and the Codex Upsaliensis:

Name	Current location	Dating	Notes
Codex Upsaliensis (DG 11)	University of Uppsala library, Sweden	First quarter of the 14th century.	Provides some variants not found in any of the three other major manuscripts, such as the name Gylfaginning.
Codex Regius (GKS 2367 4°)	Árni Magnússon Institute for Icelandic Studies, Reykjavík, Iceland	First half of the 14th century.	It is the most comprehensive of the four manuscripts, and is received by scholars to be closest to an original manuscript. This is why it is the basis for editions and translations of the Prose Edda. Its name is derived from its conservation in the Royal Library of Denmark for several centuries. From 1973 to 1997, hundreds of ancient Icelandic manuscripts were returned from Denmark to Iceland, including, in 1985, the Codex Regius, which is now preserved by the Árni Magnússon Institute for Icelandic Studies.
Codex Wormianus (AM 242 fol)	Arnamagnæan Manuscript Collection, Copenhagen, Denmark	Mid-14th century.	None
Codex Trajectinus (MSS 1374)	University of Utrecht library, Netherlands	Written c. 1600.	A copy of a manuscript that was made in the second half of the 13th century.

The likely stemma of Snorra Edda, considering only the main source of each manuscript.

The other three manuscripts are AM 748, AM 757 a 4to, and AM 738 II 4to. Although some scholars have doubted whether a sound stemma of the manuscripts can be created, due to the possibility of scribes drawing on multiple exemplars or from memory, recent work has found that the main sources of each manuscript can be fairly readily ascertained. The Prose Edda' remained fairly unknown outside of Iceland until the publication of the Edda Islandorum in 1665.

== Authorship ==
The text is generally considered to have been written or at least compiled by Snorri Sturluson. This identification is largely based on the following paragraph from a portion of Codex Upsaliensis, an early 14th-century manuscript containing the Edda:

Bók þessi heitir Edda. Hana hefir saman setta Snorri Sturluson eptir þeim hætti sem hér er skipat. Er fyrst frá Ásum ok Ymi, þar næst Skáldskaparmál ok heiti margra hluta, síðast Háttatal er Snorri hefir ort um Hákon konung ok Skúla hertuga.

Translation:

This book is called Edda. Snorri Sturluson has compiled it in the manner in which it is arranged here. There is first told about the Æsir and Ymir, then Skáldskaparmál (‘poetic diction’) and (poetical) names of many things, finally Háttatal ('enumeration of metres or verse-forms') which Snorri has composed about King Hákon and Earl Skúli.

Scholars have noted that this attribution, along with that of other primary manuscripts, is not clear whether or not Snorri is more than the compiler of the work and the author of Háttatal or if he is the author of the entire Edda. Faulkes summarizes the matter of scholarly discourse around the authorship of the Prose Edda as follows:

Snorri's authorship of the Prose Edda was upheld by the renaissance scholar Arngrímur Jónsson (1568–1648), and since his time it has generally been accepted without question. But the surviving manuscripts, which were all written more than half a century after Snorri's death, differ from each other considerably and it is not likely that any of them preserves the work quite as he wrote it. A number of passages in Skáldskaparmál especially have been thought to be interpolations, and this section of the work has clearly been subject to various kinds of revision in most manuscripts. It has also been argued that the prologue and the first paragraph and part of the last paragraph of Gylfaginning are not by Snorri, at least in their surviving forms.

Whatever the case, the mention of Snorri in the manuscripts has been influential in a common acceptance of Snorri as the author or at least one of the authors of the Edda.

== Contents ==
=== Prologue ===
The Prologue is the first section of four books of the Prose Edda, consisting of a euhemerized Christian account of the origins of Norse mythology: the Nordic gods are described as human Trojan warriors who left Troy after the fall of that city (an origin which parallels Virgil's Aeneid).

=== Gylfaginning ===
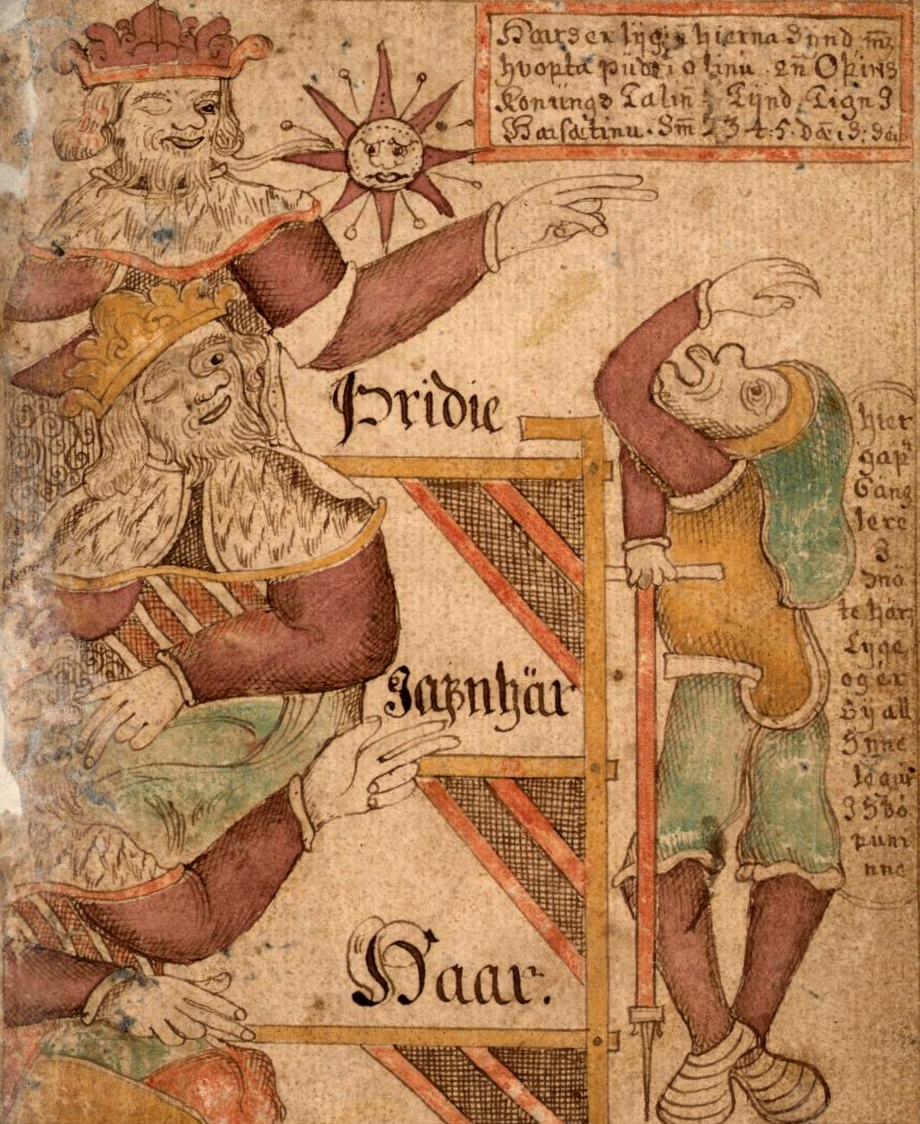
Gylfi and High, Just-as-High, and Third. Manuscript SAM 66 (Iceland, 1765–1766), Reykjavík, Árni Magnússon Institute for Icelandic Studies.

Gylfaginning (Old Icelandic 'the tricking of Gylfi') follows the Prologue in the Prose Edda. Gylfaginning deals with the creation and destruction of the world of the Nordic gods, and many other aspects of Norse mythology. The section is written in prose interspersed with quotes from eddic poetry.

=== Skáldskaparmál ===
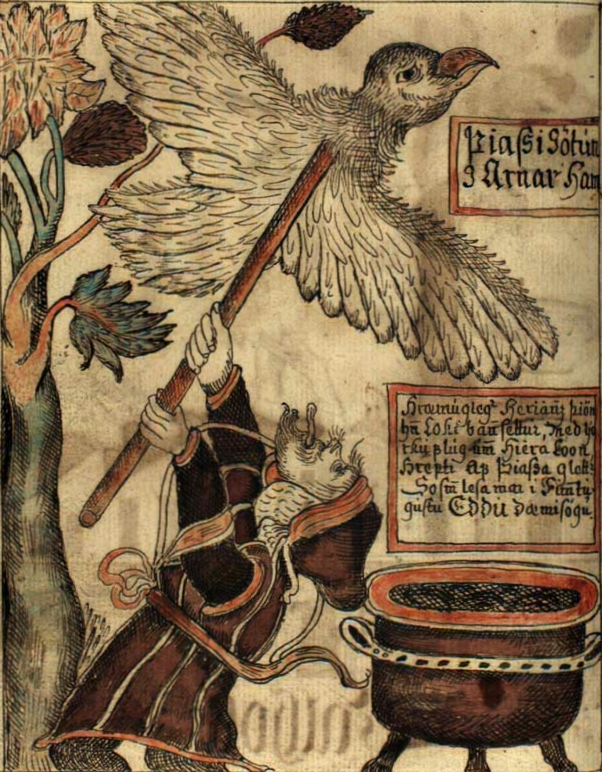
Thjazi and Loki. Beginning of the myth of the abduction of Iðunn, attested in Skáldskaparmál. Manuscript NKS 1867 4to (Iceland, 1760), Copenhagen, Royal Library

Skáldskaparmál (Old Icelandic 'the language of poetry') is the third section of Edda, and consists of a dialogue between Ægir, a jötunn who is one of various personifications of the sea, and Bragi, a skaldic god, in which both Norse mythology and discourse on the nature of poetry are intertwined. The origin of a number of kennings are given and Bragi then delivers a systematic list of kennings for various people, places, and things. Bragi then goes on to discuss poetic language in some detail, in particular heiti, the concept of poetical words which are non-periphrastic, for example "steed" for "horse", and again systematises these. This section contains numerous quotes from skaldic poetry.

=== Háttatal ===
Háttatal (Old Icelandic "list of verse-forms") is the last section of Prose Edda. The section is composed by the Icelandic poet, politician, and historian Snorri Sturluson. Primarily using his own compositions, it exemplifies the types of verse forms used in Old Norse poetry. Snorri took a prescriptive as well as descriptive approach; he has systematized the material, often noting that the older poets did not always follow his rules.

== Adaptations ==
The version of Snorra Edda preserved in the manuscript Uppsala, University of Uppsala Library, DG 11, known as the Uppsala Edda, is quite different from the other early manuscripts. There is debate as to whether it represents an early draft by Snorri or a later abridgement and adaptation of Snorri's text.

The Prose Edda was adapted into a text known as Litla Skálda, "a concise manual of kenning-making" which survives in two manuscripts alongside Snorra Edda. In the view of Björn K. Þórólfsson, Litla Skálda was "a later concoction of elements from Snorra Edda in a reduced and corrupt form", but in Pétur Húni Björnsson's opinion it "contains material similar to Snorra Edda but distinct enough to be considered a parallel text rather than a text derived from Snorra Edda".

== Translations ==
The Prose Edda has been the subject of numerous translations. The most recent ones into English have been by Jesse Byock (2006), Anthony Faulkes (1987 / 2nd ed. 1995), Jean Young (1954), and Arthur Gilchrist Brodeur (1916). Many of these translations are abridged; the technical nature of the Háttatal means it is frequently excluded, and the Skáldskaparmál often has its more Old Norse thesaurus aspects abridged as well.

Translations into English

- The Prose or Younger Edda commonly ascribed to Snorri Sturluson. Translated by Dasent, George Webbe. Norstedt and Sons. 1842.
- The Younger Edda: Also Called Snorre's Edda, or the Prose Edda. Translated by Anderson, Rasmus B. Chicago: Griggs. 1880. (Project Gutenberg e-text, 1901 ed.; Wikisource edition.)
- The Elder Eddas of Saemund Sigfusson; and the Younger Eddas of Snorre Sturleson. Translated by Thorpe, Benjamin; Blackwell, I. A. 1906. Compilation of two translations made earlier; Blackwell's translation of the Prose Edda is from 1847.
- The Prose Edda . Translated by Brodeur, Arthur Gilchrist. The American-Scandinavian Foundation. 1916 – via Wikisource.
- The Prose Edda of Snorri Sturluson; Tales from Norse Mythology. Translated by Young, Jean. Bowes & Bowes. 1954.
- Edda (PDF). Translated by Faulkes, Anthony (2nd ed.). Everyman. 1995. ISBN 0-460-87616-3.
- The Prose Edda. Translated by Byock, Jesse. Penguin Classics. 2006. ISBN 978-0-141-91274-5.
- Pálsson, Heimir, ed. (2012). The Uppsala Edda: DG 11 4to (PDF). Translated by Faulkes, Anthony. London: The Viking Society for Northern Research. ISBN 978-0-903521-85-7. A version based strictly on the Codex Upsaliensis (DG 11) document; includes both Old Norse and English translation.

Translations into other languages

- Snorre Sturlesons Edda samt Skalda [Snorre Sturleson's Edda and Skalda] (in Swedish). Translated by Cnattingius, Andreas Jacobus. 1819.
- Edda Snorra Sturlusonar - Edda Snorronis Sturlaei (in Latin). Translated by Egilsson, Sveinbjörn; Sigurðsson, Jón; Jónsson, Finnur. 3 volumes: Vol. 1: Formali, Gylfaginning, Bragaraedur, Skaldskarparmal et Hattatal (1848), Vol. 2: Tractatus Philologicos et Additamenta ex Codicibus Manuscripts (1852), Vol. 3: Praefationem, Commentarios in Carmina, Skaldatal cum Commentario, Indicem Generalem (1880–1887)
- Die prosaische Edda im Auszuge nebst Vǫlsunga-saga und Nornagests-þáttr [The Prose Edda in excerpt along with Völsunga saga and Norna-Gests þáttr]. Bibliothek der ältesten deutschen Literatur-Denkmäler. XI. Band (in German). Translated by Wilken, Ernst.
  - Teil I: Text, Paderborn F. Schöningh, 1912 [1877]
  - Teil II: Glossar, Paderborn F. Schöningh, 1913 [1877]
- Snorre Sturlusons Edda: Uppsala-Handskriften DH II (in Icelandic). Translated by Grape, Anders. 1977. OCLC 2915588. , 2 volumes : 1 facsimile; 2 translation and notes
- Snorre Sturlusons Edda: Uppsala-Handskriften DH II (in Swedish). Translated by Grape, Anders; Kallstenius, Gottfrid; Thorell, Olod. 1977. OCLC 774703003. , 2 volumes : 1 facsimile; 2 translation and notes
- Edda Menor [Younger Edda] (in Spanish). Translated by Lerate, Luis. Alianza Editorial. 1984. ISBN 978-84-206-3142-4.
- L'Edda: Récits de mythologie nordique [The Edda: Stories of Norse Myth]. L'Aube des peuples (in French). Translated by Dillmann, François-Xavier. Gallimard. 1991. ISBN 2-07-072114-0.

== Old Norse editions ==
- Egilsson, Sveinbjörn, ed. (1848), Edda Snorra Sturlusonar: eða Gylfaginníng, Skáldskaparmál og Háttatal, Prentuð i prentsmiðjulandsins, af prentara H. Helgasyni
- Jónsson, Guðni, ed. (1935), Edda Snorra Sturlusonar: með skáldatali (in Icelandic), Reykjavík: S. Kristjánsson
- Faulkes, Anthony (ed.), Edda, Norse text and English notes.
  - Snorri Sturluson (2005) [1982], Prologue and Gylfaginning (PDF) (2nd ed.), ISBN 978-0-903521-64-2
  - Snorri Sturluson (1998), Skáldskaparmál 1: Introduction, text and notes (PDF), Viking Society for Northern Research, ISBN 978-0-903521-36-9
  - Snorri Sturluson (1998), Skáldskaparmál 2: Glossary and index of names (PDF), Viking Society for Northern Research, ISBN 978-0-903521-38-3
  - Snorri Sturluson (2007) [1991], Háttatal (PDF) (2nd ed.), ISBN 978-0-903521-68-0
- Snorri Sturluson (2012), The Uppsala Edda: DG 11 4to (PDF), Heimir Pálsson (ed.), Anthony Faulkes (trans.), Viking Society for Northern Research, ISBN 978-0-903521-85-7

== See also ==
- Edda
- Saga
- Heimskringla
