= Skáldskaparmál =

Second section of the Prose Edda

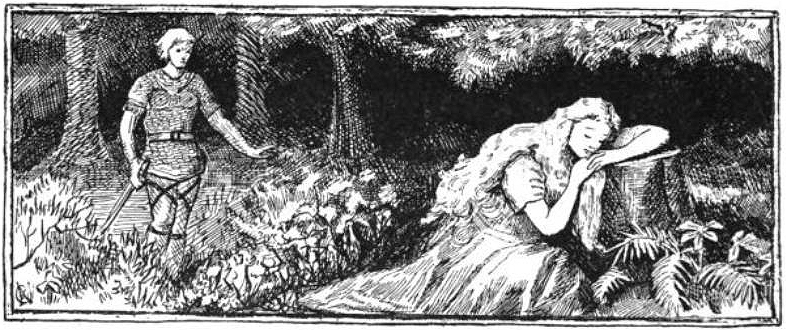
Near a wood, the goddess Sif rests her head on a stump while Loki lurks behind, sword in hand. Loki intends to cut Sif's hair per a myth recounted in Skáldskaparmál.

Skáldskaparmál (Old Norse: 'Poetic Diction' or 'The Language of Poetry'; Old Norse pronunciation: [ˈskaldskaparˌmɒːl]; Icelandic pronunciation: [ˈskaultˌskaːparˌmauːl̥]) is the second part of the Prose Edda, compiled by Snorri Sturluson. It consists of a dialogue between Ægir, the divine personification of the sea, and Bragi, the god of poetry, in which both stories of the Æsir and discourse on the nature of poetry are intertwined. The work additionally includes tales of human heroes and kings. The overarching mythological setup gradually fades and the work becomes more of an early form of a poetic thesaurus of Old Norse, presumably intended for usage by skalds (Norse poets and bards of the era). Much of the work is focused on poetic phrases and descriptors. The origin of these kennings is given; Bragi delivers a systematic list of kennings for various Æsir, people, places, and things. He then goes on to discuss poetic language in some detail, in particular heiti, essentially poetic synonyms or alternate words. For example, the simple hestr, "horse", might be replaced by jór, "steed".

In general, the parts of the work that attract the most interest from modern audiences are the descriptions of Norse mythology, even if given in passing to illustrate a poetic phrase. Some of the stories in the Skáldskaparmál include:

- How Idunn was captured by the giant Thjazi, with Loki involved in both her kidnapping and her recovery.
- The origin of Kvasir, who is transformed into the mead of poetry after his death.
- The duel between the giant Hrungnir and Thor.
- The plan by the giant Geirrödr to entrap Thor, and how Thor triumphed with the aid of the giant Grídr.
- Loki cutting Sif's prized golden hair in a mischievous prank, and being obliged into arranging the dwarves to create a replacement golden wig, as well as five other powerful artifacts.
- How the dwarf Andvari's Rhinegold and golden ring were created and given a powerful curse; the downfall of the dwarves Ótr, Hreidmar, Fafnir, and Regin; the involvement of Sigurd the Volsung and the valkyrie Brynhild; which all leads into the origin of the Niflungs and Gjukungs, human noble families with a tragic story.
- A version of the Grottasöngr, describing how King Mysing killed King Frodi and made the sea salty.
- The deeds of Danish King Hrolf Kraki in defeating the Swedish King Adils
- A never-ending battle called Hjaðningavíg, where King Hogni's daughter Hildr resurrects all the slain at night with magic so they can resume fighting the next day.

== Background ==
The Skáldskaparmál is both a retelling of Norse legend as well as a treatise on poetry. It is unusual among surviving medieval European works as a poetic treatise written both in and about the poetry of a local vernacular language, Old Norse; other Western European works of the era were on Latin language poetry, as Latin was the language of scholars and learning. The work seems to have been used to aid in the composition of rímur (Icelandic ballads) in the centuries after its composition.

The Skáldskaparmál quotes poems as examples of usage; many of these poems are only known from the excerpts and mentions here, as they are lost works. Poems quoted include the Thorsdrápa, Ragnarsdrápa, Húsdrápa, Bjarkamál, and others. Other lost sources believed to be consulted by Sturluson include the Skjöldunga saga, possibly an early version of the Völsunga saga, and even more hypothetically a lost work referred to as *Hladajarla saga. One work that does not appear to be consulted much, conversely, is Saxo Grammaticus's Gesta Danorum, which seems to have been the main history textbook used by scholars of the period; whether its history was not of interest to Sturluson, he did not have access to it, or he had access to it but couldn't read Latin is not known.

It is not known whether the Skáldskaparmál and the Gylfaginning were written by the same author, or even if the first third of the Skáldskaparmál has the same author as the latter two thirds. They are certainly written in two different styles, with the Gylfaginning very dialogue-heavy, while the Skáldskaparmál tends toward third-person storytelling, and occasional didactic sections in its latter parts. Regardless, the two fit together snugly, containing almost no repetition of stories.

The chapter markings used in most editions are not original to the work, but rather applied in later printings for the ease of discussion.

== Contents ==
The Æsir then went to their feast, and the twelve Æsir who were to be judges sat in their high seats. They were named Thor, Njördr, Frey, Týr, Heimdall, Bragi, Vídar, Váli, Ull, Hoenir, Forseti, and Loki. The goddesses (Ásynjur), who did likewise, were Frigg, Freyja, Gefjun, Idunn, Gerd, Sigyn, Fulla, and Nanna. To Ægir it seemed that everything he saw around him was noble. Magnificent shields hung on all the wallboards. Strong mead was served and the drinking was heavy. Next to Ægir sat Bragi. They drank together and exchanged stories. Bragi told Ægir about the many things that had happened to the Æsir.

— Jesse Byock translation, Skáldskaparmál, Chapter 1

The Skáldskaparmál is around 50,000 words. It opens with a framing story, the Bragarædur or Bragi's Discourses. A person named Ægir travels to Asgard. This is Ægir, a personification of the sea (what his name literally translates as) and possibly a giant as well, who is married to the goddess Rán. There, he is seated next to Bragi at a banquet. Bragi is the god of poetry, but there is also a Bragi the skald mentioned later; it is unclear if the skald was named for the god, or if the human skald had been elevated to the rank of god later.

The framing story does not last; it seems to stop around chapter 17 (out of 75 chapters), and the work's educational role as a textbook comes to the fore in later sections. A story on a synonym for gold, the fire of Ægir, does mention that after visiting Asgard, Ægir invited the Æsir to visit him in three months, and he used a hoard of shining gold to light the hall. Less happily, Loki quarreled with the other gods during the event, and killed a slave of Ægir named Fimafeng.

=== Notable stories ===
==== Idunn and Thjazi ====
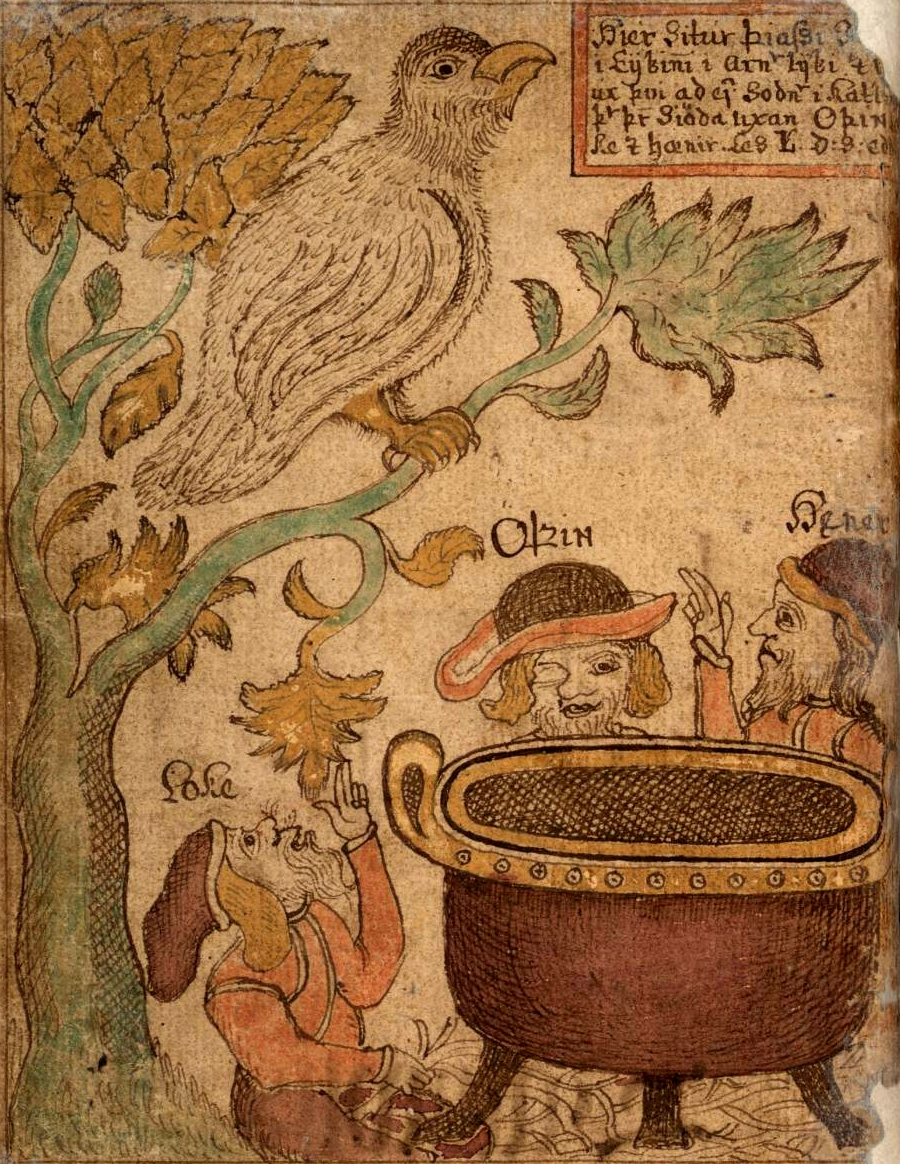
Illustration from Icelandic Manuscript, SÁM 66 of Thjazi in giant eagle form while Odin, Loki, and Hoenir attempt to cook in a cauldron below

Odin, Loki, and Hoenir go on a journey. A giant eagle offers help in cooking an ox in exchange for a share of the meal; the three agree, but Loki quickly attacks in anger after seeing the eagle take a plum share. The eagle flys off with Loki, and only agrees to let Loki go after extracting a promise for Loki to help lure Idunn away from Asgard. In truth, the eagle was a transformed version of the giant Thjazi. Loki honors his promise and lures Idunn away so she can be kidnapped by Thjazi. As Idunn was the source of the apples that keep the Æsir from aging, this was a major threat to the well-being of Asgard. Loki is threatened with death and torture unless he fixes the problem, and leaves to go recover Idunn, albeit first asking for Freyja's falcon cloak (valshamr) to aid his mission. He travels to Jötunheim and steals into Thjazi's dwelling while he is away, transforms Idunn into a nut, and flies off in the form of a falcon using the cloak, clutching Idunn in his talons. Thjazi pursues while in the form of an eagle after discovering Idunn missing. After a high-speed chase between falcon-Loki pursued by eagle-Thjazi, Thjazi crashes and is then killed by the awaiting Æsir near the gate to Asgard. His daughter Skadi swears vengeance for her father, but the Æsir make a deal with her. She is offered compensation in a marriage of a man of her choice, but she can only see the feet of those offered: the result is she is married to Njord, a god of the sea presumably with very clean feet. She also demands that the Æsir make her laugh again after her loss, and Loki does a prank involving tying a cord between his genitals and a goat. Finally, Thjazi's eyes are cast into the heavens to make two new stars.

==== The Mead of Poetry ====
At the close of the Æsir–Vanir War, both sides spit into a cauldron to seal the treaty between the Æsir and Vanir. Surprisingly, a new entity arises from the saliva in the cauldron: Kvasir, who travels the land teaching men, and acquires a reputation as the wisest one of all. Fjalar and Galar, two evil dwarves, murder Kvasir after inviting him into their home. They ferment his blood with honey to create a powerful mead that turns one into a skald or a scholar if drunk. The two continue their killing spree by inviting the giant Gillingr to go fishing, then drowning him by overturning his boat; they then murder Gillingr's widow, too. It falls to Gillingr's son (or nephew in some manuscripts), Suttungr, to avenge him. Suttungr strands the two dwarves on a reef and threatens them with drowning; they buy their freedom by offering Suttungr the mead they made from Kvasir's blood. Suttungr accepts and moves the mead to his home Hnitbjörg ("Clashing Rocks"), stores it in three vats, and places his daughter Gunnlöd to guard it.

Odin, desirous of the power of the mead, hatches an elaborate scheme to steal it. He goes to the home of Baugi, one of Suttungr's brothers. He uses a magic whetstone to magically sharpen the scythes of Baugi's thralls (slaves), and theatrically tosses the whetstone into the sky; somehow, in the struggle to be the one to catch it, the newly sharpened scythes held by the thralls chop off each other's necks. Odin, now calling himself "Bölverkr" (literally "worker of misfortune"), introduces himself to Baugi and convinces him the thralls had killed themselves unprovoked. Knowing Baugi suddenly needs new laborers, he offers to trade his work for a sip of the mead. Bölverkr works for a season, but Suttungr is unwilling to accept his brother's request. Baugi reluctantly helps Odin by drilling a hole in the side of Hnitbjörg with an auger; Odin transforms into a snake and wiggles through. Once inside, Odin seduces Gunnlöd and lays with her for three nights; she permits him three sips of mead in exchange, one from each vat. Odin, however, twists the agreement, and drains the entire vats in his "sips" of the mead, taking everything. He then transforms into an eagle to fly back to Asgard; Suttungr also transforms into eagle form and pursues. While Odin vomits most of the mead back into vats prepared for him in Asgard, in his flight, he distracted Suttungr by excreting some of the mead backward. This excreted mead of poetry is accessible to all, but is the source of bad poets and poetry.

This version is the most complete account of the tale, but kennings from other sources validate it by calling poetry the "drink of dwarves", "sea of Óðrerir" (one of the three vats), or "booty of Odin". While Odin is a trickster in the story who deceives Gunnlöd and causes the deaths of innocents in his plan, it does not appear he was particularly judged harshly for his actions; there is a sentiment that cultural treasures should go to the worthy and strong, not hidden away in a secluded stronghold, and thus approved of Odin's actions.

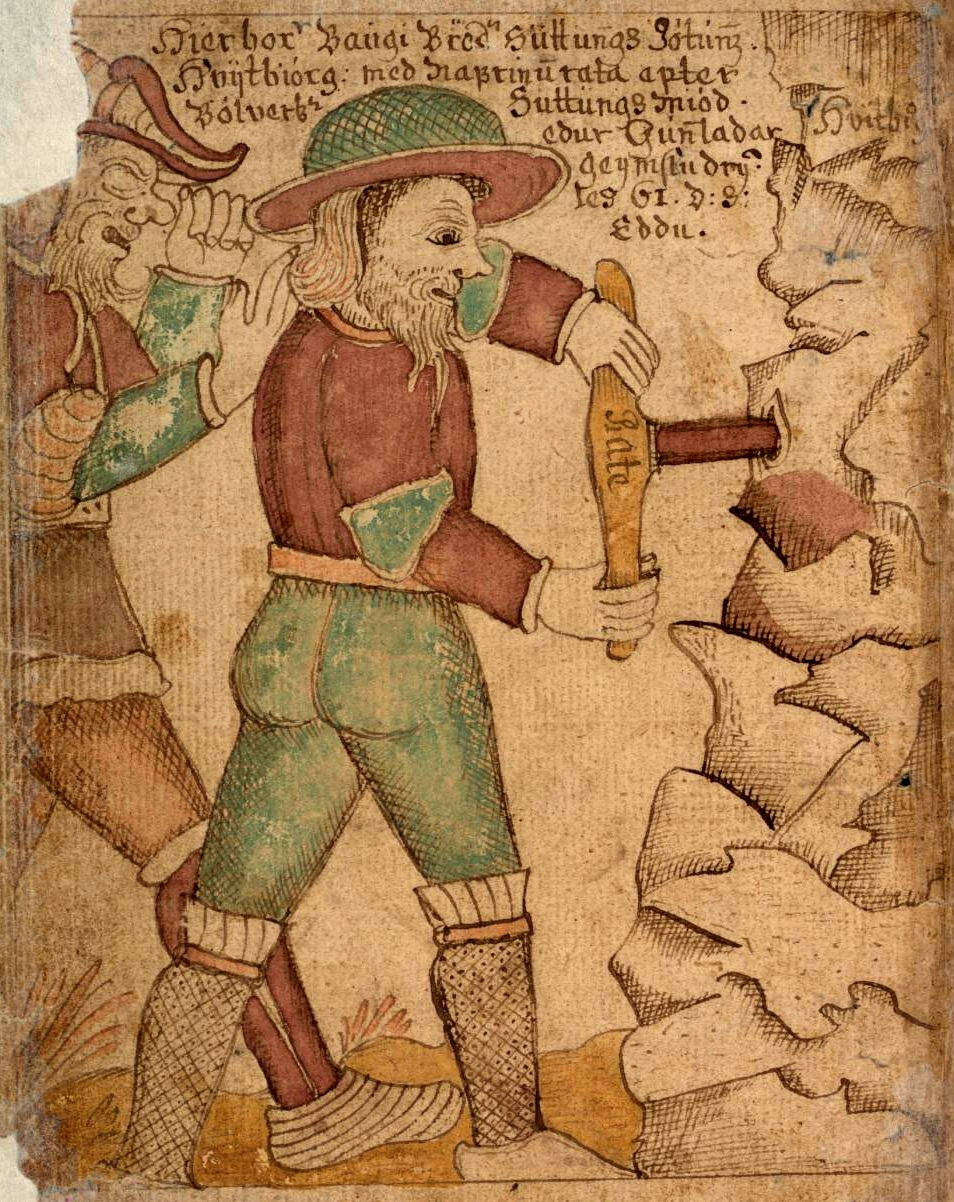
Baugi using his auger to drill a hole in the mountainous Hnitbjörg (Illustration from SÁM 66)

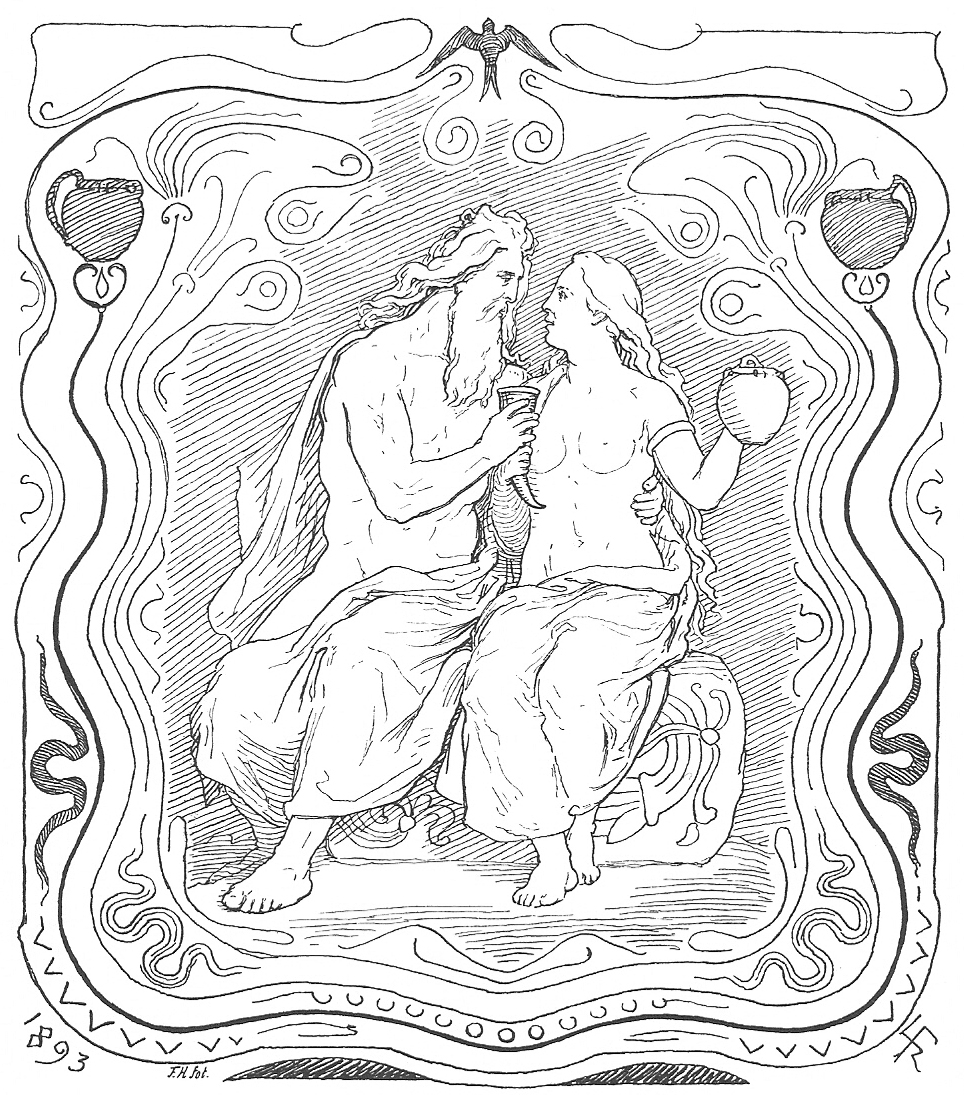
Odin seducing Gunnlöd (Lorenz Frølich)

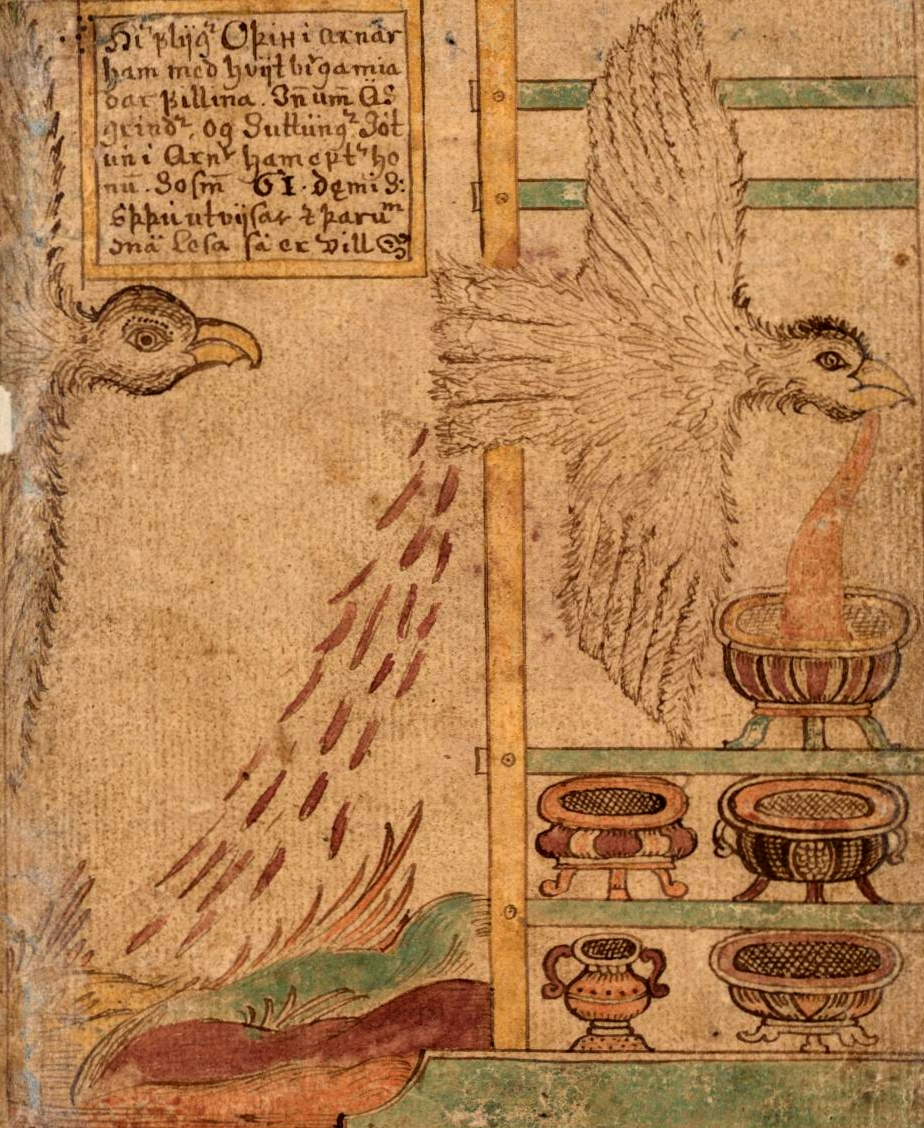
Eagle-odin vomits the Mead of Poetry into vats, but excretes some behind to distract eagle-Suttungr (Illustration from SÁM 66)

==== Hrungnir and Thor ====
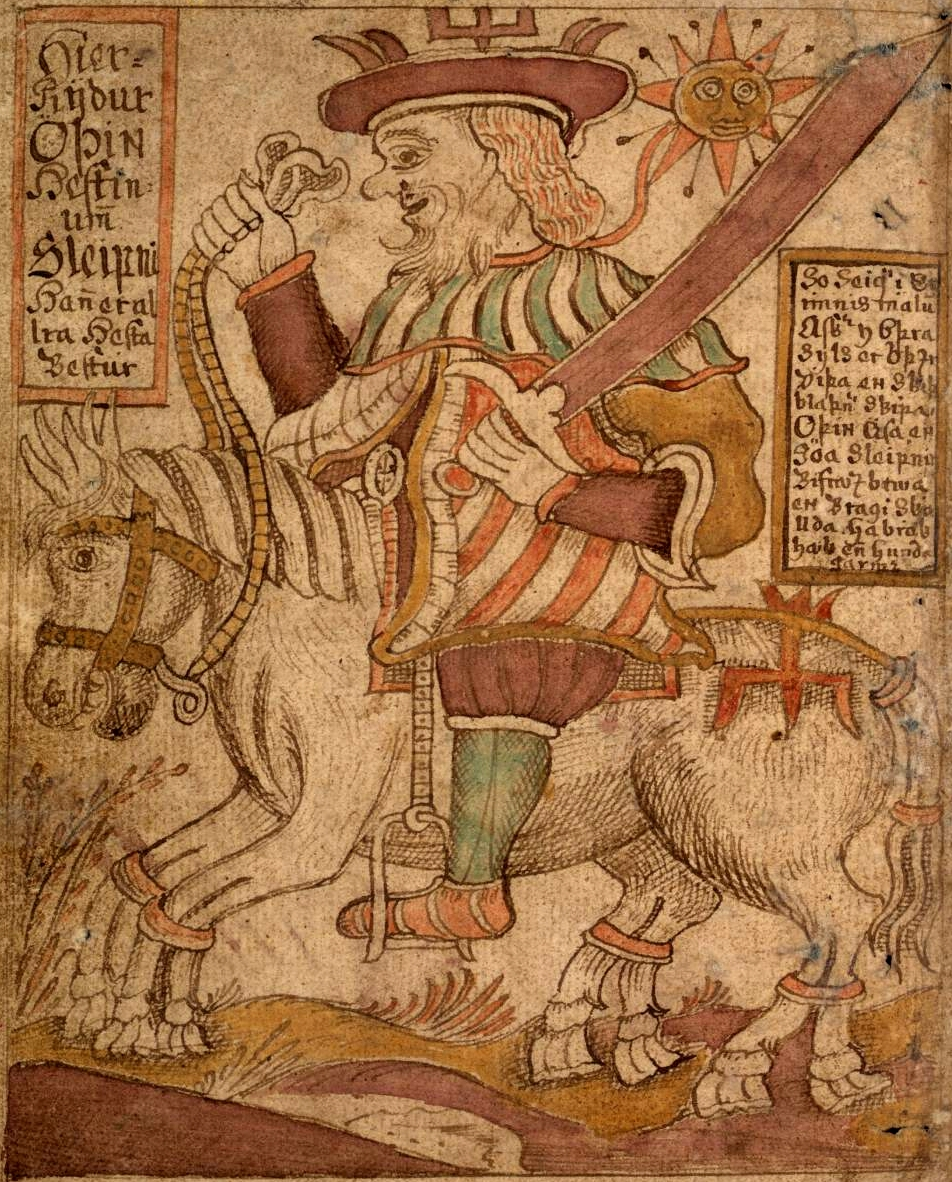
Odin riding Sleipnir (Illustration from SÁM 66)

Odin visits the giant Hrungnir in Jötunheim, and the two have a horse race on their steeds Sleipnir and Gullfaxi (Gold-Mane). Odin wins; Hrungnir follows him back to the gates of Asgard, and he is unwisely invited inside. He is a terrible guest and gets extremely drunk, and boasts he should kill all the Æsir except the beautiful Freya and Sif, whom he says he would be willing to take back to Jötunheim with him. Thor returns to Asgard from an expedition hunting trolls, is informed of Hrungnir's insolence, and challenges him. Hrungnir points out he is here under invitation from Odin himself, that he is further weaponless at the moment, and Thor would gain scant renown for killing him while unarmed. He offers to fight a duel along the border of Asgard and Jötunheim; Thor was eager to accept given that none had offered him single-combat before.

The other giants, wary of losing their strongest fighter in Hrungnir, build a massive clay construct called Mökkurkálfi to aid Hrungnir as a second. The only heart they can find large enough to power the construct is a mare's heart, though, which falters in courage upon having to face Thor. Hrungnir himself has a stone heart capable of facing against Thor as well as a stone shield that could perhaps absorb Thor's thunder. Thor is accompanied by Thjálfi, who tells Hrungnir that Thor is planning on attacking from underground. Hrungnir unwisely heeds Thjálfi's warning and stands on his stone shield to protect himself, but Thor instead attacks from afar, throwing his hammer Mjöllnir at Hrungnir. Hrungnir throws his own weapon, a massive whetstone, at the incoming hammer. The weapons collide in the middle, breaking the whetstone into pieces and sending flint shards all across Midgard (an explanation of them being a rock that can start fires). Mjöllnir continues on its path and smashes Hrungnir's skull, killing him; a shard of the whetstone also continues toward Thor, embedding itself in Thor's skull. The two fall forward into each other, with Hrungnir's foot covering Thor's neck. Meanwhile, Thjálfi defeats Mökkurkálfi. The audience of Æsir can find none strong enough to heft Hrungnir's corpse off Thor, though. Magni, son of Thor and the giantess Járnsaxa comes forward, and hefts Hrungnir away; for this he is rewarded with Thor giving him Hrungnir's horse Gullfaxi, despite Odin's disapproval at a half-giant receiving the fine horse.

Thor then visits a wise woman Gróa, seeking to have the whetstone shard removed from his head. She begins chanting spells to pull it out (perhaps using seidhr?), but Thor attempts to reward her by saying that he thinks her husband, Aurvandill the Valiant, will come home after being missing. He tells a story that he met Aurvandill in icy wastes, carried him on his back across the river Elivagar, and threw a frozen toe of his into the sky where it now serves as a star. Gróa is so happy to hear the news she forgets what she is doing, and thus the whetstone shard remained stuck in Thor's head.

==== Geirrödr's plot ====
Loki spies on the giant Geirrödr in the form of a falcon, but is captured. After being kept in a chest for three months, Loki eventually agrees to Geirrödr's demands: he will free Loki if he lures Thor to his abode, but without his hammer Mjölnir, his belt of strength (Megingjörð), or his iron gloves (Járngreipr).

An unarmed Thor and Loki travel to Geirrödr's abode, but stop by the home of the giantess Grídr, who warns Thor of the danger. Grídr loans Thor her own belt, gauntlets, and staff (Grídarvöl). The two ford the Vimur River, but the water rises as they get to the midpoint; they brace themselves with the borrowed belt of strength and rod to avoid being washed away. Thor spies Gjálp, one of Geirrödr's daughters, at the source causing the torrent (possibly from urinating?), and throws a stone at her. Arriving at Geirrödr's home, Thor sits down in a chair, but the chair suddenly rises toward the ceiling, threatening to crush him—Geirrödr's two daughters Gjálp and Greip were hiding under it and pushing it up. Thor uses Grídr's staff to brace himself against the roof and to push back down, breaking their backs. Thor is invited for games in Geirrödr's hall, and Geirrödr throws a bar of iron heated so much as to be glowing at Thor. With his borrowed iron gloves, Thor snatches the missile out of the air, and throws it back with such force it goes straight through the pillar that Geirrödr had ducked behind, Geirrödr himself, and the wall, not stopping until it was deep within the earth. Thor has triumphed again.

The Prose Edda then quotes the Thorsdrápa version of the same tale, which is largely similar but indicates Thjálfi also accompanied Thor on this adventure.

==== Sif's hair ====
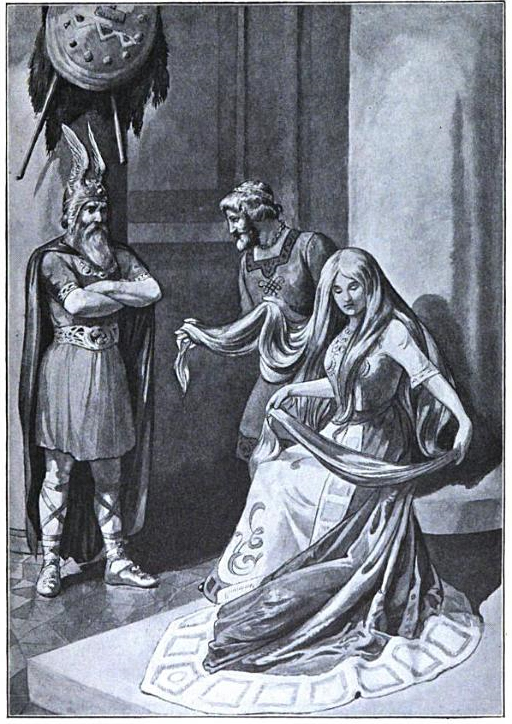
Loki presents to Sif and Thor the replacement hair spun from gold by the dwarves.

This story is introduced as an explanation for why "Sif's hair" is a kenning for "gold". Loki cuts off Sif's prized blonde hair "for mischief's sake". (The Lokasenna ("Loki's quarrel"), of the Poetic Edda, has Loki seemingly accuse Sif of having an affair with him, perhaps explaining how Loki was able to cut the hair in the first place, although it is unclear if Snorri was referencing this.) Thor, Sif's husband, is enraged by the prank, and demands Loki make it right—or else he'll break every bone in Loki's body. Loki travels to the dwarves, and the sons of Ivaldi agree to create replacement hair made from gold, except it would magically attach to Sif's flesh and grow like normal hair. The sons of Ivaldi also create the portable ship Skídbladnir and the spear Gungnir. Loki raises the stakes by approaching the dwarf Brokkr and his brother Eitri (Sindri) and wagering his head that they cannot create three artifacts that exceed the first three. The three create the shining golden boar Gullinbursti, the replicating ring Draupnir, and the war hammer Mjölnir. As the two dwarves work, a fly stings them and mildly distracts them; the fly is presumably a transformed Loki trying to ensure he wins his bet.

The six gifts are brought back to Asgard to be judged by Odin, Thor, and Freyr. The golden wig is given to Sif, Skídbladnir is given to Freyr, and Gungnir is given to Odin. Brokkr and Eitri give Gullinbursti to Freyr, Draupnir to Odin, and Mjölnir to Thor. The judges confer, and decide that Mjölnir is the best gift of them all, even despite the flaw of the haft of the hammer being a tad short due to Loki's interference. This means Loki has lost the bet, and therefore presumably his life. Loki flees using shoes that can walk on water and fly, but Thor catches him and brings him back. Loki raises a quibble: he had offered his head, but not his neck. The dwarves settle for using an awl to sew Loki's mouth shut, clearly a part of his face, rather than beheading him.

==== The Rhinegold, Sigurd the dragon-slayer, and the Valkyrie Brynhild ====
The Skáldskaparmál includes its own version of the Völsunga saga. The cursed Rhinegold triggers a train of tragedy across generations.

==== Passing mentions ====
Various other presumed mythological references exist but only as mentions. For example, in discussing stories of Heimdall, the author mentions that Heimdall fought Loki over the necklace Brísinga-men while in the form of seals, citing Úlfr Uggason, but this reference if it ever existed has since been lost.

=== Kennings, heiti, and poetic titles ===
Much of the work consists of offering elaborate, poetic titles, often followed by excerpts of poetry that discuss the same concept. These kennings often obliquely refer to a related deed, family, or god. For an example, the work offers the following ways to refer to the earth, most notably "Ymir's flesh":

How shall earth be referred to? By calling it Ymir's Flesh and mother of Thor, daughter of Ónar, Bride of Odin, rival of Frigg and Rind and Gunnlod, mother-in-law of Sif, floor and base of winds' hall, sea of animals, daughter of Night, sister of Aud and Day. As Eyvind Skaldaspillir said:

Now the river's elf-disc [sun of river = gold] is hidden
in the body of giants' enemy's [Thor's] mother [lord, earth].
Mighty are the undertakings of a powerful people.

— Anthony Faulkes translation, Skáldskaparmál, Chapter 24

This is a layered example, as Thor is referred to by the kenning "giant's enemy" (or "slayer of giants" elsewhere), and once that substitution is made, "Thor's mother" becomes a reference to the earth where the gold was hidden. The chapter goes on to cite excerpts from Hallfredr the Troublesome Skald and Thjódólf of Hvinir as well.

In other sections, the Skáldskaparmál writes more directly of poetic synonyms for words, or heiti. These can read somewhat strangely in translation, as the Old Norse terms do not always have perfect parallels of English words (or other languages' words), although the general idea of using "fancier" terminology still comes across. For example, synonyms for numbers of people are offered here:

Each one singly is called man; it is twain if they are two; three are a thorp; four are a group; a band is five men; if there are six, it is a squad; seven complete a crew; eight men make a panel; nine are 'good fellows;' ten are a gang; eleven form an embassy; it is a dozen if twelve go together; thirteen are a crowd; fourteen are an expedition; it is a gathering, when fifteen meet; sixteen make a garrison; seventeen are a congregation; to him who meets eighteen, they seem enemies enough. He who has nineteen men has a company; twenty men are a posse; thirty are a squadron; forty, a community; fifty are a shire; sixty are an assembly; seventy are a line; eighty are a people; one hundred is a host.

— Arthur Gilchrist Brodeur translation, Skáldskaparmál, Chapter 66

=== Nafnaþulur ===
The last part of Skáldskaparmál, which is not in all manuscripts of the Edda, is Nafnaþulur, a list of names of beings and items in Norse mythology.
