= Kenning =

Figure of speech

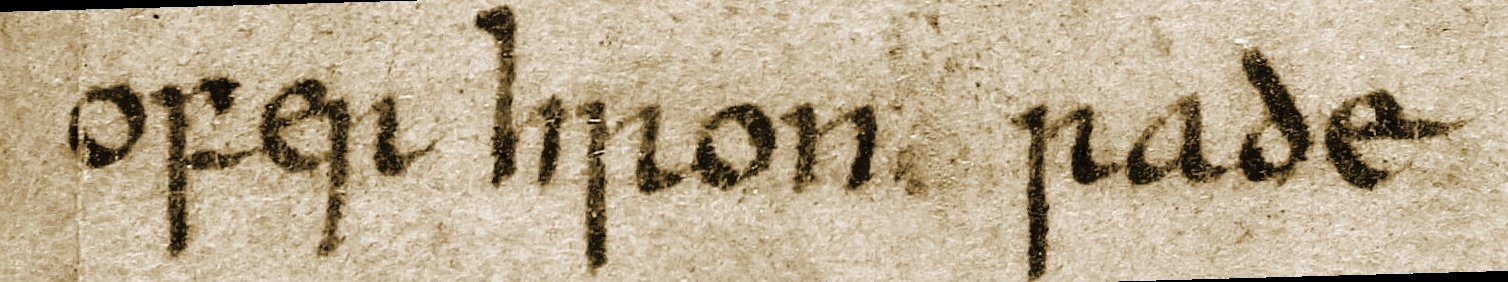
Detail of the Old English manuscript of the poem Beowulf, showing the words ofer hron rade ('over the whale's road'), meaning 'over the sea'.

A kenning (Icelandic: [cʰɛnːiŋk]) is a figure of speech, a figuratively phrased compound term that is used in place of a simple single-word noun. For instance, the Old English kenning 'whale's road' (hron rade) means 'sea', as does swanrād ('swan's road').

A kenning has two parts: a base-word (also known as a head-word) and a determinant. So in whale's road, road is the base-word, and whale's is the determinant. This is the same structure as in the modern English term skyscraper; the base-word here would be scraper, and the determinant sky. In some languages, kennings can recurse, with one element of the kenning being replaced by another kenning.

Kennings are strongly associated with Old Norse–Icelandic and Old English alliterative verse. They continued to be a feature of Icelandic poetry (including rímur) for centuries, together with the closely related heiti. Although kennings are sometimes hyphenated in English translation, Old Norse poetry did not require kennings to be in normal word order, nor do the parts of the kenning need to be side-by-side. The lack of grammatical cases in modern English makes this aspect of kennings difficult to translate. Kennings are now rarely used in English, but are still used in the Germanic language family.

== Etymology ==
The word kenning is used in manuscripts of Snorri Sturluson's Edda to refer to this kind of poetic construction, and its use in English in this context is taken directly from Old Norse.

The corresponding modern verb to ken survives in Scots and English dialects and in general English through the derivative existing in the standard language in the set expression beyond one's ken, "beyond the scope of one's knowledge" and in the phonologically altered forms uncanny, 'surreal, supernatural', and canny, 'shrewd, prudent'. Modern Scots retains (with slight differences between dialects) tae ken 'to know', kent 'knew' or 'known', Afrikaans ken 'be acquainted with' and 'to know' and kennis 'knowledge'. Old Norse kenna ( (Modern Icelandic kenna, Swedish känna (to feel or to know of), Danish kende (same as Swedish but closer "to know" as føle is the Danish word for "to feel"), Norwegian kjenne or kjenna (to understand or to know)) is cognate with Old English cennan, Old Frisian kenna, kanna, Old Saxon (ant) kennian, Middle Dutch and Dutch kennen, Old High German (ir-, in-, pi-) chennan (Middle High German and German kennen), Gothic kannjan < Proto-Germanic *kannjanan, originally causative of *kunnanan 'to know (how to)' which is the same in modern swedish "att kunna (kan)", whence Modern English can 'to be able'. The word ultimately derives from *ǵneh₃, the same Proto-Indo-European root that yields Modern English know, Latin-derived terms such as cognition and ignorant, and Greek gnosis.

== Structure ==
Old Norse kennings take the form of a genitive phrase (báru fákr 'wave's horse' = 'ship' (Þorbjörn Hornklofi: Glymdrápa 3)) or a compound word (gjálfr-marr 'sea-steed' = 'ship' (Anon.: Hervararkviða 27)). The simplest kennings consist of a base-word (Icelandic stofnorð, German Grundwort) and a determinant (Icelandic kenniorð, German Bestimmung) which qualifies, or modifies, the meaning of the base-word. The determinant may be a noun used uninflected as the first element in a compound word, with the base-word constituting the second element of the compound word. Alternatively the determinant may be a noun in the genitive case placed before or after the base-word, either directly or separated from the base-word by intervening words.

Thus the base-words in these examples are fákr 'horse' and marr 'steed', the determinants báru 'waves' and gjálfr 'sea'. The unstated noun which the kenning refers to is called its referent, in this case: skip 'ship'.

The base-word of the kenning íss rauðra randa ('icicle of red shields' [SWORD], Einarr Skúlason: Øxarflokkr 9) is íss ('ice, icicle') and the determinant is rǫnd ('rim, shield-rim, shield'). The referent is 'sword'.

In Old Norse poetry, either component of a kenning (base-word, determinant or both) could consist of an ordinary noun or a heiti "poetic synonym". In the above examples, fákr and marr are distinctively poetic lexemes; the normal word for 'horse' in Old Norse prose is hestr.

=== Complex kennings ===
The skalds also employed complex kennings in which the determinant, or sometimes the base-word, is itself made up of a further kenning: grennir gunn-más 'feeder of war-gull' = 'feeder of raven' = 'warrior' (Þorbjörn Hornklofi: Glymdrápa 6); eyðendr arnar hungrs 'destroyers of eagle's hunger' = 'feeders of eagle' = 'warrior' (Þorbjörn Þakkaskáld: Erlingsdrápa 1) (referring to carrion birds scavenging after a battle). Where one kenning is embedded in another like this, the whole figure is said to be tvíkent 'doubly determined, twice modified'.

Frequently, where the determinant is itself a kenning, the base-word of the kenning that makes up the determinant is attached uninflected to the front of the base-word of the whole kenning to form a compound word: mög-fellandi mellu 'son-slayer of giantess' = 'slayer of sons of giantess' = 'slayer of giants' = 'the god Thor' (Steinunn Refsdóttir: Lausavísa 2).

If the figure comprises more than three elements, it is said to be rekit "extended". Kennings of up to seven elements are recorded in skaldic verse. Snorri himself characterises five-element kennings as an acceptable license but cautions against more extreme constructions: Níunda er þat at reka til hinnar fimtu kenningar, er ór ættum er ef lengra er rekit; en þótt þat finnisk í fornskálda verka, þá látum vér þat nú ónýtt. "The ninth [license] is extending a kenning to the fifth determinant, but it is out of proportion if it is extended further. Even if it can be found in the works of ancient poets, we no longer tolerate it." The longest kenning found in skaldic poetry occurs in Hafgerðingadrápa by Þórðr Sjáreksson and reads nausta blakks hlé-mána gífrs drífu gim-slöngvir 'fire-brandisher of blizzard of ogress of protection-moon of steed of boat-shed', which simply means 'warrior'.

=== Word order and comprehension ===
Word order in Old Norse was generally much freer than in Modern English because Old Norse and Old English are synthetic languages, where added prefixes and suffixes to the root word (the core noun, verb, adjective or adverb) carry grammatical meanings, whereas Middle English and Modern English use word order to carry grammatical information, as analytic languages. This freedom is exploited to the full in skaldic verse and taken to extremes far beyond what would be natural in prose. Other words can intervene between a base-word and its genitive determinant, and occasionally between the elements of a compound word (tmesis). Kennings, and even whole clauses, can be interwoven. Ambiguity is usually less than it would be if an English text were subjected to the same contortions, thanks to the more elaborate morphology of Old Norse.

Another factor aiding comprehension is that Old Norse kennings tend to be highly conventional. Most refer to the same small set of topics, and do so using a relatively small set of traditional metaphors. Thus a leader or important man will be characterised as generous, according to one common convention, and called an "enemy of gold", "attacker of treasure", "destroyer of arm-rings", etc. and a friend of his people. Nevertheless, there are many instances of ambiguity in the corpus, some of which may be intentional, and some evidence that, rather than merely accepting it from expediency, skalds favoured contorted word order for its own sake.

=== Semantics ===
Kennings could be developed into extended, and sometimes vivid, metaphors: tröddusk törgur fyr [...] hjalta harðfótum 'shields were trodden under the hard feet of the hilt (sword blades)' (Eyvindr Skáldaspillir: Hákonarmál 6); svarraði sárgymir á sverða nesi 'wound-sea (blood) sprayed on headland of swords (shield)' (Eyvindr Skáldaspillir: Hákonarmál 7). Snorri calls such examples nýgervingar and exemplifies them in verse 6 of his Háttatal. The effect here seems to depend on an interplay of more or less naturalistic imagery and jarring artifice. But the skalds were not averse either to arbitrary, purely decorative, use of kennings: "That is, a ruler will be a distributor of gold even when he is fighting a battle and gold will be called the fire of the sea even when it is in the form of a man's arm-ring on his arm. If the man wearing a gold ring is fighting a battle on land the mention of the sea will have no relevance to his situation at all and does not contribute to the picture of the battle being described" (Faulkes (1997), pp. 8–9).

Snorri draws the line at mixed metaphor, which he terms nykrat 'made monstrous' (Snorri Sturluson: Háttatal 6), and his nephew called the practice löstr 'a fault' (Óláfr hvítaskáld: Third Grammatical Treatise 80). In spite of this, it seems that "many poets did not object to and some must have preferred baroque juxtapositions of unlike kennings and neutral or incongruous verbs in their verses" (Foote & Wilson (1970), p. 332). E.g. heyr jarl Kvasis dreyra 'listen, earl, to Kvasir's blood (poetry)' (Einarr skálaglamm: Vellekla 1).

Sometimes there is a kind of redundancy whereby the referent of the whole kenning, or a kenning for it, is embedded: barmi dólg-svölu 'brother of hostility-swallow' = 'brother of raven' = 'raven' (Oddr breiðfirðingr: Illugadrápa 1); blik-meiðendr bauga láðs 'gleam-harmers of the land of rings' = 'harmers of gleam of arm' = 'harmers of ring' = 'leaders, nobles, men of social standing (conceived of as generously destroying gold, i.e. giving it away freely)' (Anon.: Líknarbraut 42).

While some Old Norse kennings are relatively transparent, many depend on a knowledge of specific myths or legends. Thus the sky might be called naturalistically él-ker 'squall-vat' (Markús Skeggjason: Eiríksdrápa 3) or described in mythical terms as Ymis haus 'Ymir's skull' (Arnórr jarlaskáld: Magnúsdrápa 19), referring to the idea that the sky was made out of the skull of the primeval giant Ymir. Still others name mythical entities according to certain conventions without reference to a specific story: rimmu Yggr 'Odin of battle' = 'warrior' (Arnórr jarlaskáld: Magnúsdrápa 5).

Poets in medieval Iceland even treated Christian themes using the traditional repertoire of kennings complete with allusions to heathen myths and aristocratic epithets for saints: Þrúðr falda 'goddess of headdresses' = 'Saint Catherine' (Kálfr Hallsson: Kátrínardrápa 4).

Kennings of the type AB, where B routinely has the characteristic A and thus this AB is tautological, tend to mean "like B in that it has the characteristic A", e.g. 'shield-Njörðr', tautological because the god Njörðr by nature has his own shield, means 'like Njörðr in that he has a shield', i.e. 'warrior'. A modern English example is "painted Jezebel" as a disapproving expression for a woman too fond of using cosmetics.

Kennings may include proper names. A modern example of this is an ad hoc usage by a helicopter ambulance pilot: "the Heathrow of hang gliders" for the hills behind Hawes in Yorkshire in England, when he found the air over the emergency site crowded with hang-gliders.

Sometimes a name given to one well-known member of a species is used to mean any member of that species. For example, Old Norse valr means 'falcon', but Old Norse mythology mentions a horse named Valr, and thus in Old Norse poetry valr is sometimes used to mean 'horse'.

=== Ellipsis ===
A term may be omitted from a well-known kenning: val-teigs Hildr 'hawk-ground's valkyrie/goddess' (Haraldr Harðráði: Lausavísa 19). The full expression implied here is 'goddess of gleam/fire/adornment of ground/land/seat/perch of hawk' = 'goddess of gleam of arm' = 'goddess of gold' = 'lady' (characterised according to convention as wearing golden jewellery, the arm-kenning being a reference to falconry). The poet relies on listeners' familiarity with such conventions to carry the meaning.

== Definitions ==
Some scholars take the term kenning broadly to include any noun-substitute consisting of two or more elements, including merely descriptive epithets (such as Old Norse grand viðar 'bane of wood' = 'fire' (Snorri Sturluson: Skáldskaparmál 36)), while others would restrict it to metaphorical instances (such as Old Norse sól húsanna 'sun of the houses' = 'fire' (Snorri Sturluson: Skáldskaparmál 36)), specifically those where "[t]he base-word identifies the referent with something which it is not, except in a specially conceived relation which the poet imagines between it and the sense of the limiting element'" (Brodeur (1959) pp. 248–253). Some even exclude naturalistic metaphors such as Old English forstes bend 'bond of frost' = 'ice' or winter-ġewǣde 'winter-raiment' = 'snow': "A metaphor is a kenning only if it contains an incongruity between the referent and the meaning of the base-word; in the kenning the limiting word is essential to the figure because without it the incongruity would make any identification impossible" (Brodeur (1959) pp. 248–253). Descriptive epithets are a common literary device in many parts of the world, whereas kennings in this restricted sense are a distinctive feature of Old Norse and, to a lesser extent, Old English poetry.

Snorri's own usage, however, seems to fit the looser sense: "Snorri uses the term 'kenning' to refer to a structural device, whereby a person or object is indicated by a periphrastic description containing two or more terms (which can be a noun with one or more dependent genitives or a compound noun or a combination of these two structures)" (Faulkes (1998 a), p. xxxiv). The term is certainly applied to non-metaphorical phrases in Skáldskaparmál: En sú kenning er áðr var ritat, at kalla Krist konung manna, þá kenning má eiga hverr konungr. 'And that kenning which was written before, calling Christ the king of men, any king can have that kenning.' Likewise in Háttatal: Þat er kenning at kalla fleinbrak orrostu [...] 'It is a kenning to call battle 'spear-crash' [...]'.

Snorri's expression kend heiti 'qualified terms' appears to be synonymous with kenningar, although Brodeur applies this more specifically to those periphrastic epithets which do not come under his strict definition of kenning.

Sverdlov approaches the question from a morphological standpoint. Noting that the modifying component in Germanic compound words can take the form of a genitive or a bare root, he points to behavioural similarities between genitive determinants and the modifying element in regular Old Norse compound words, such as the fact that neither can be modified by a free-standing (declined) adjective. According to this view, all kennings are formally compounds, notwithstanding widespread tmesis.

== Old Norse kennings in context ==
In the following dróttkvætt stanza, the Norwegian skald Eyvindr skáldaspillir (died ca. 990) compares the greed of King Harald Greycloak (Old Norse: Haraldr) to the generosity of his predecessor, Haakon the Good (Hákon):

Bárum, Ullr, of alla,
ímunlauks, á hauka
fjöllum Fýrisvalla
fræ Hákonar ævi;

nú hefr fólkstríðir Fróða
fáglýjaðra þýja
meldr í móður holdi
mellu dolgs of folginn
—Eyvindr skáldaspillir, Lausavísa

A literal translation reveals several kennings: "Ullr of the war-leek! We carried the seed of Fýrisvellir on our hawk-mountains during all of Haakon's life; now the enemy of the people has hidden the flour of Fróði's hapless slaves in the flesh of the mother of the enemy of the giantess."

This could be paraphrased as "O warrior, we carried gold on our arms during all of King Haakon's life; now the enemy of the people has hidden gold in the earth." The kennings are:

Ullr ... ímunlauks, 'warrior', from Ullr, the name of a god, and ímun-laukr, 'sword' (literally 'war-leek'). By convention, the name of any god can be associated with another word to produce a kenning for a certain type of man; here "Ullr of the sword" means 'warrior'. War-leek is a kenning for 'sword' that likens the shape of the sword to that of a leek. The warrior referred to may be King Harald.

Hauka fjöllum, 'arms', from hauka 'hawk' and fjöll 'mountain'. This is a reference to the sport of falconry, where a bird of prey is perched on the arm of the falconer. By convention, 'hawk' combined with a term for a geographic feature forms a kenning for 'arm'.

Fýrisvalla fræ, 'gold', from Fýrisvellir, the plains of the river Fýri, and fræ, 'seed'. This is an allusion to a legend retold in Skáldskaparmál and Hrólfs saga kraka in which King Hrolf and his men scattered gold on the plains (vellir) of the river Fýri south of Gamla Uppsala to delay their pursuers.

Fróða fáglýjaðra þýja meldr, 'flour of Fróði's hapless slaves', is another kenning for 'gold'. It alludes to the Grottasöngr legend.

Móður hold mellu dolgs, 'flesh of the mother of the enemy of the giantess', 'earth'. Here the earth is personified as the goddess Jörð, mother of Thor, enemy of the jǫtnar.

== Old English and other kennings ==
The practice of forming kennings has traditionally been seen as a common Germanic inheritance, but this has been disputed since, among the early Germanic languages, their use is largely restricted to Old Norse and Old English poetry. A possible early kenning for 'gold' (walha-kurna "Roman/Gallic grain") is attested in the Proto-Norse runic inscription on the Tjurkö (I)-C bracteate. Kennings are virtually absent from the surviving corpus of continental West Germanic verse; the Old Saxon Heliand contains only one example: lîk-hamo 'body-raiment' = 'body' (Heliand 3453 b), a compound which, in any case, is normal in West Germanic and North Germanic prose (Old English līchama, Old High German lîchamo, lîchinamo, Dutch lichaam, Old Icelandic líkamr, líkami, Old Swedish līkhamber, Swedish lekamen, Danish and Norwegian Bokmål legeme, Norwegian Nynorsk lekam).

Old English kennings are all of the simple type, possessing just two elements. Examples for 'sea': seġl-rād 'sail-road' (Beowulf 1429 b), swan-rād 'swan-road' (Beowulf 200 a), bæð-weġ 'bath-way' (Andreas 513 a), hron-rād 'whale-road' (Beowulf 10), hwæl-weġ 'whale-way' (The Seafarer 63 a). Most Old English examples take the form of compound words in which the first element is uninflected: heofon-candel 'sky-candle' = 'the sun' (Exodus 115 b). Kennings consisting of a genitive phrase occur too, but rarely: heofones ġim 'heaven's gem' = 'the sun' (The Phoenix 183).

Old English poets often place a series of synonyms in apposition, and these may include kennings (loosely or strictly defined) as well as the literal referent: Hrōðgar maþelode, helm Scyldinga ... 'Hrothgar, helm (protector, lord) of the Scyldings, said ...' (Beowulf 456).

Old Frisian also had kennings, though they were relatively rare. In legal documents regarding the protection of children and pregnant women, the term bēnenaburcht ('fortress of the bones') is used for 'womb'.

Although the word kenning is not often used for non-Germanic languages, a similar form can be found in Biblical poetry in its use of parallelism. Some examples include Genesis 49:11, in which "blood of grapes" is used as a kenning for 'wine', and Job 15:14, where "born of woman" is a parallel for 'man'.

== Modern usage ==
Figures of speech similar to kennings occur in Modern English (both in literature and in regular speech), and are often found in combination with other poetic devices. For example, the Madness song "The Sun and the Rain" contains the line "standing up in the falling-down", where "the falling-down" refers to rain and is used in juxtaposition to "standing up". Some recent English writers have attempted to use approximations of kennings in their work. John Steinbeck used kenning-like figures of speech in his 1950 novella Burning Bright, which was adapted into a Broadway play that same year. According to Steinbeck biographer Jay Parini, "The experiment is well-intentioned, but it remains idiosyncratic to the point of absurdity. Steinbeck invented compound phrases (similar to the Old English use of kennings), such as 'wife-loss' and 'friend-right' and 'laughter-starving,' that simply seem eccentric."

Kennings remain somewhat common in German (Drahtesel 'wire-donkey' for bicycle, Feuerstuhl 'fire-chair' for motorcycle, Stubentiger 'chamber-tiger' for cat, and so on).

The poet Seamus Heaney regularly employed kennings in his work; for example, bone-house for 'skeleton'.

== See also ==
- Bahuvrihi
- Difrasismo
- Elegant variation
- Heiti
- List of kennings
- Makurakotoba
- Metalepsis
- Metonymy
- Synecdoche

== Bibliography ==
- Bremmer, Jr, Rolf H. (2009), An Introduction to Old Frisian: History, Grammar, Reader, Glossary, Amsterdam: John Benjamins Publishing Company, pp. 130–133, ISBN 978-90-272-9004-5
- Brodeur, Arthur Gilchrist (1952), The Meaning of Snorri's Categories, United States: University of California Press
- Brodeur, Arthur Gilchrist (1959), The Art of Beowulf, University of California Press
- Faulkes, Anthony (1997), "Poetic Inspiration in Old Norse and Old English Poetry." Dorothea Coke Memorial Lecture in Northern Studies delivered at University College London 28 November 1997, Viking Society for Northern Research
- Faulkes, Anthony (1998 a), "Edda: Skáldskaparmál: 1, Introduction, Text and Notes." Viking Society for Northern Research
- Faulkes, Anthony (1998 b), "Edda: Skáldskaparmál: 2, Glossary and Index of Names." Viking Society for Northern Research
- Foote, Peter & Wilson, D, M. (1970), The Viking Achievement, Book Club Associates, London
- Gardner, Thomas (1969), "The Old English Kenning: A Characteristic Feature of Germanic Poetical Diction?", Modern Philology, 67 (2): 109–117, doi:10.1086/390147, ISSN 0026-8232, S2CID 162218658
- Heusler, Andreas (1941), Die altgermanische Dichtung. (2nd ed.), Potsdam, OCLC 560148330
- Hultin, Neil C. (1974), "Some Homonyms in the Old Norse Atlakvida", MLN, 89 (5): 862–866, doi:10.2307/2907091, JSTOR 2907091
- Krause, Wolfgang (1971), Die Sprache der urnordischen Runeninschriften, Carl Winter Universitätsverlag, Heidelberg
- Kuhn, Hans (1893), 'The rímur-poet and his audience', Saga-Book 23:6
- Looijenga, Jantina Helena (1997), "Runes around the North Sea and on the Continent AD150-700: Texts and Contexts." University of Groningen dissertation.
- Looijenga, Tineke (2003), Texts & Contexts of the Oldest Runic Inscriptions (PDF), Leiden: Koninklijke Brill NV, ISBN 90-04-12396-2, archived from the original (PDF) on 2022-05-08
- Meissner, Rudolf (1984), Die Kenningar der Skalden ein Beitrag zur skaldischen Poetik, Leipzig: Olms, ISBN 3-487-07534-2, OCLC 1069966201
- Sverdlov, Ilya V, (2006), "Kenning Morphology: Towards a Formal Definition of the Skaldic Kenning, or Kennings and Adjectives." 13th International Saga Conference: Durham and York
