= Icelandic Manuscript, SÁM 66 =

Icelandic Manuscript

SÁM 66 (Stofnun Árna Magnússonar á Íslandi) is an 18th-century manuscript now at the Árni Magnússon Institute for Icelandic Studies, Iceland. Reference information and a copy of this manuscript can be found online. This book was written in Iceland in 1765 and 1766. The back cover is dated 1765. The text follows that of earlier manuscripts and printed books. However the book contains a nice collection of illustrated pages on pages 73-80 (many of which are reproduced below).

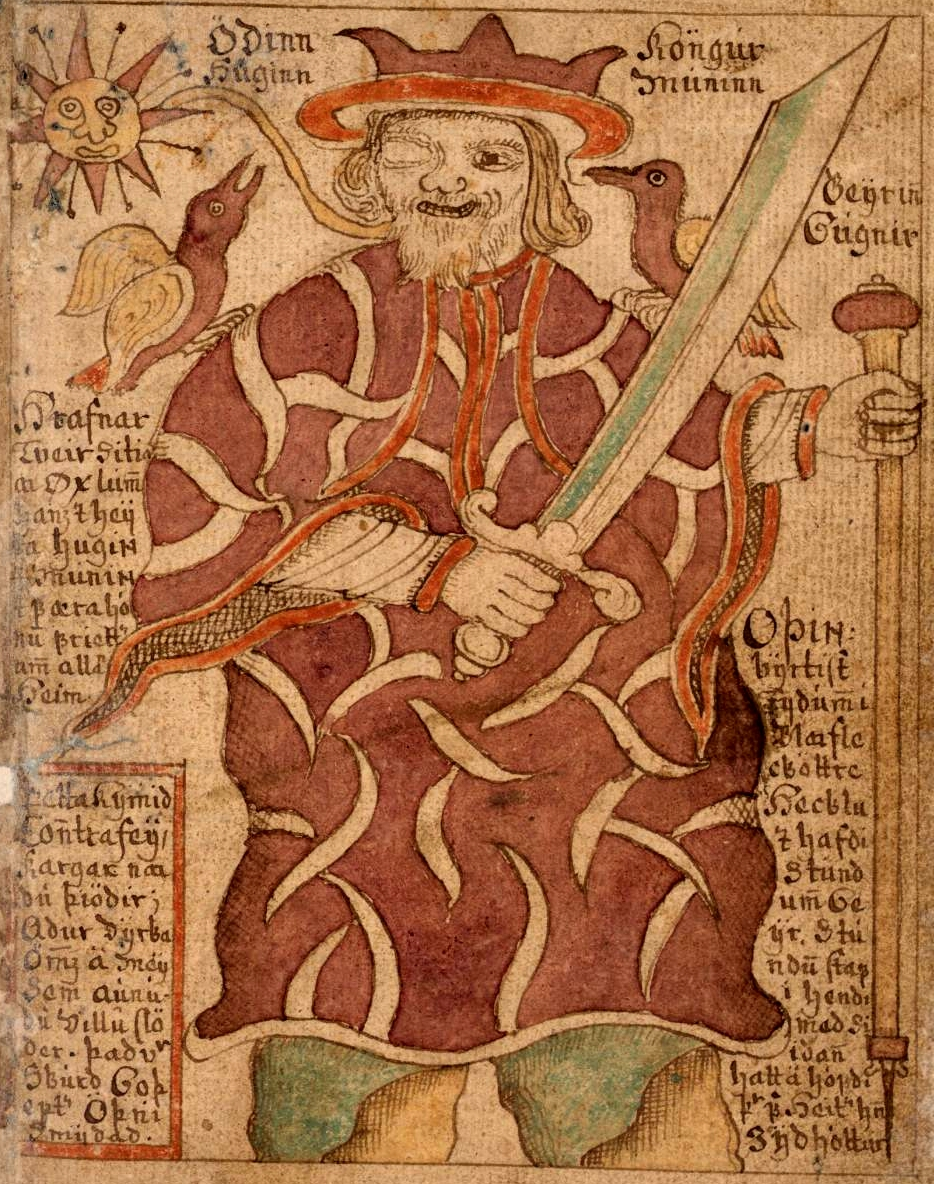
Odin

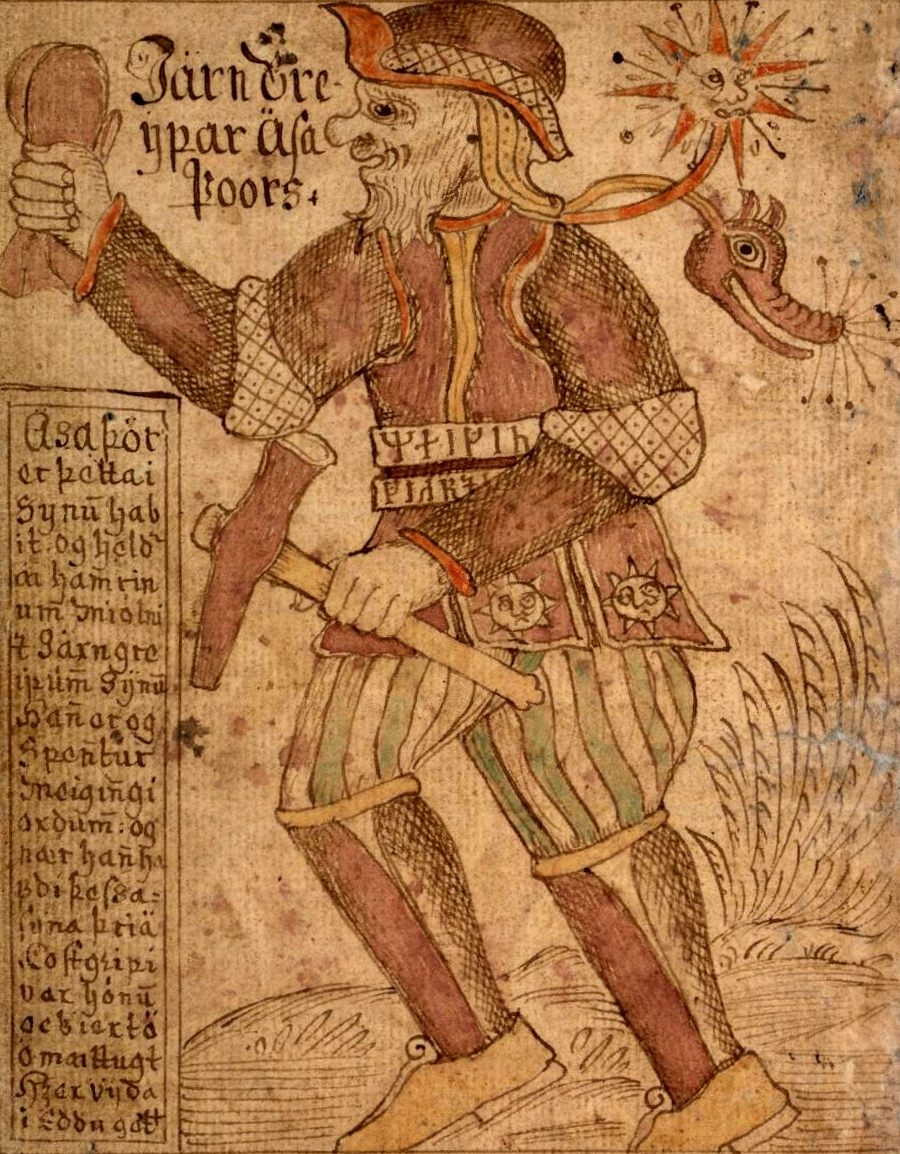
Thor

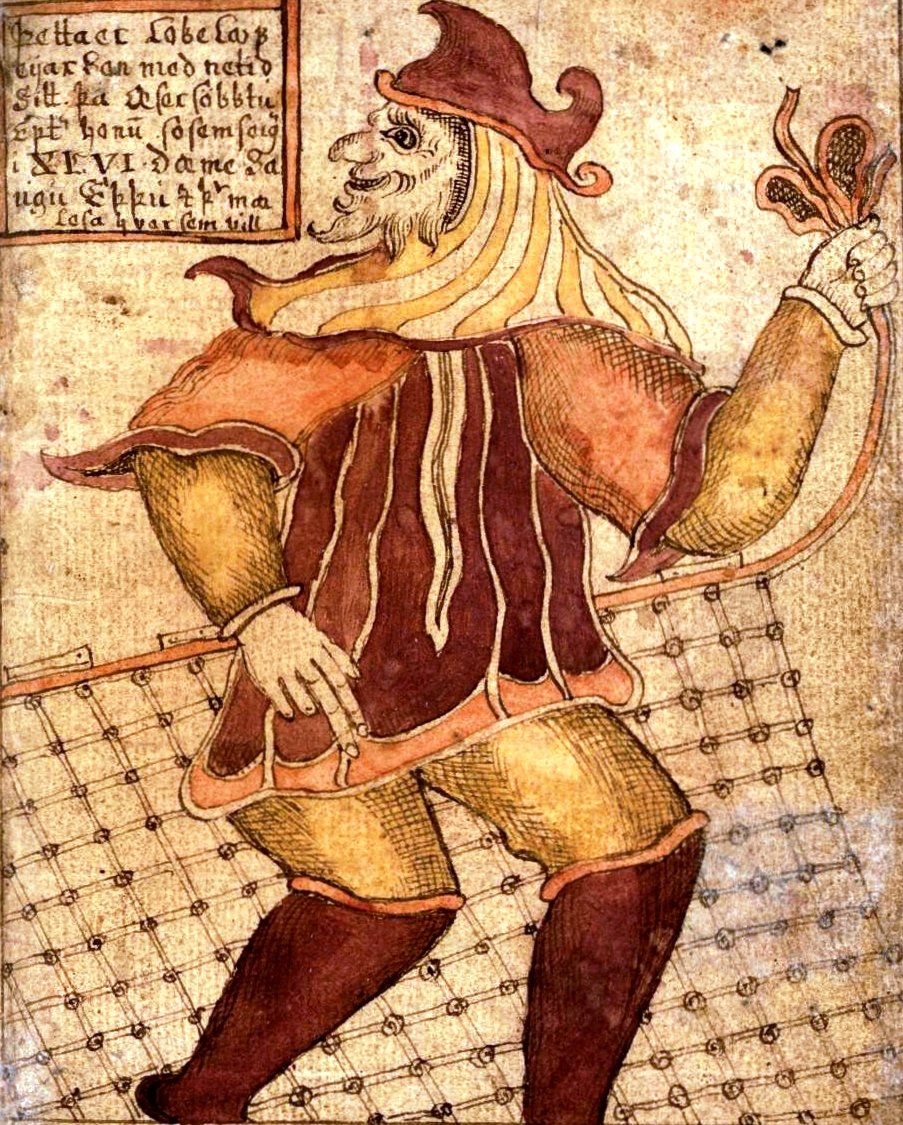
Loki

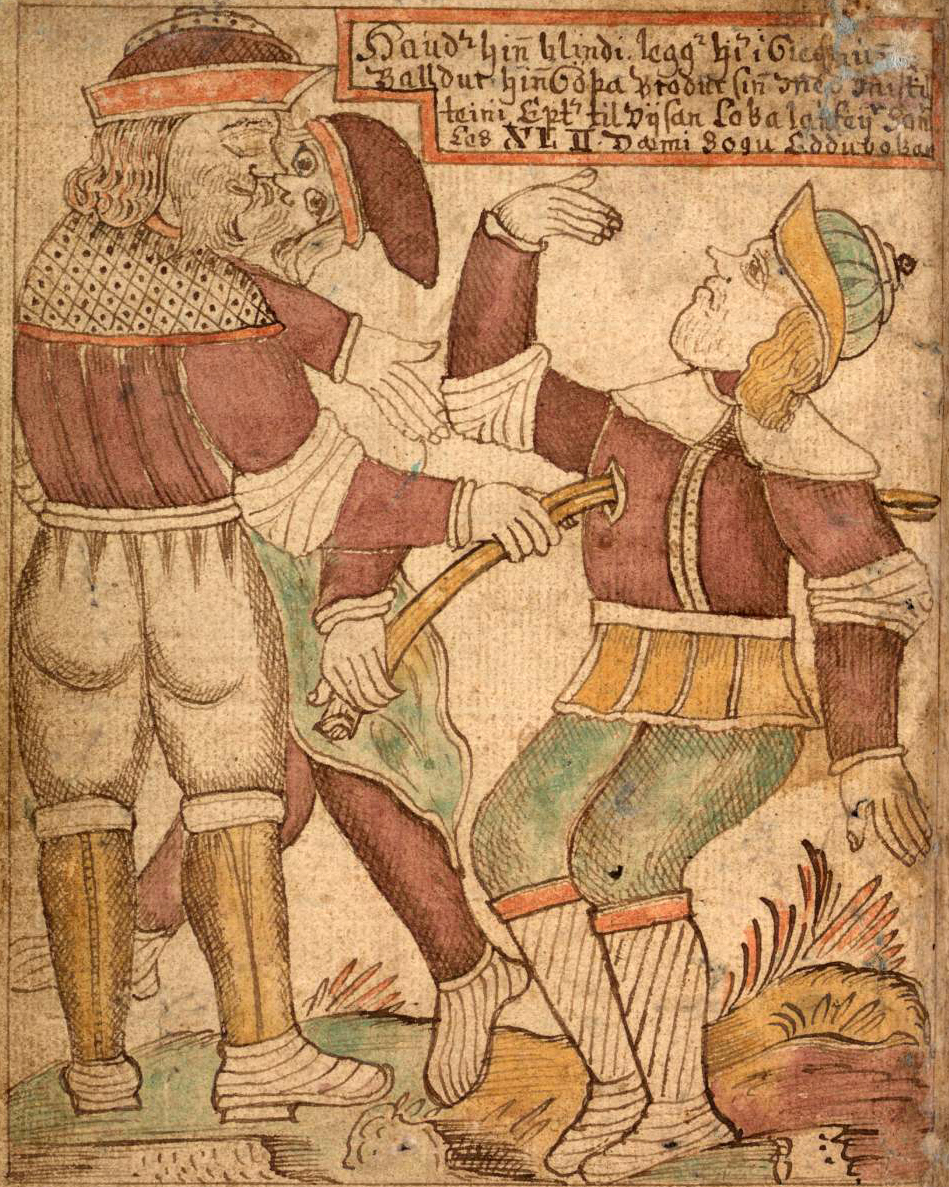
Balder

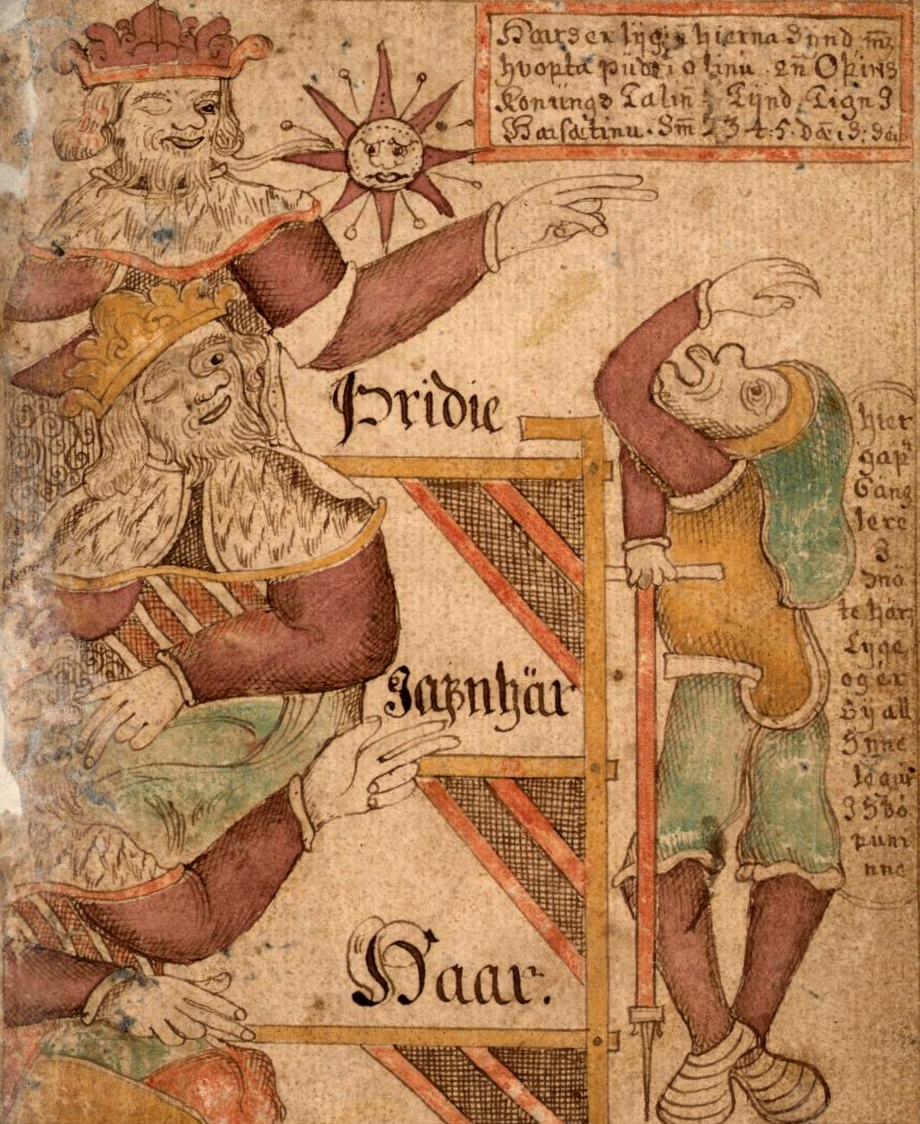
Gylfaginning

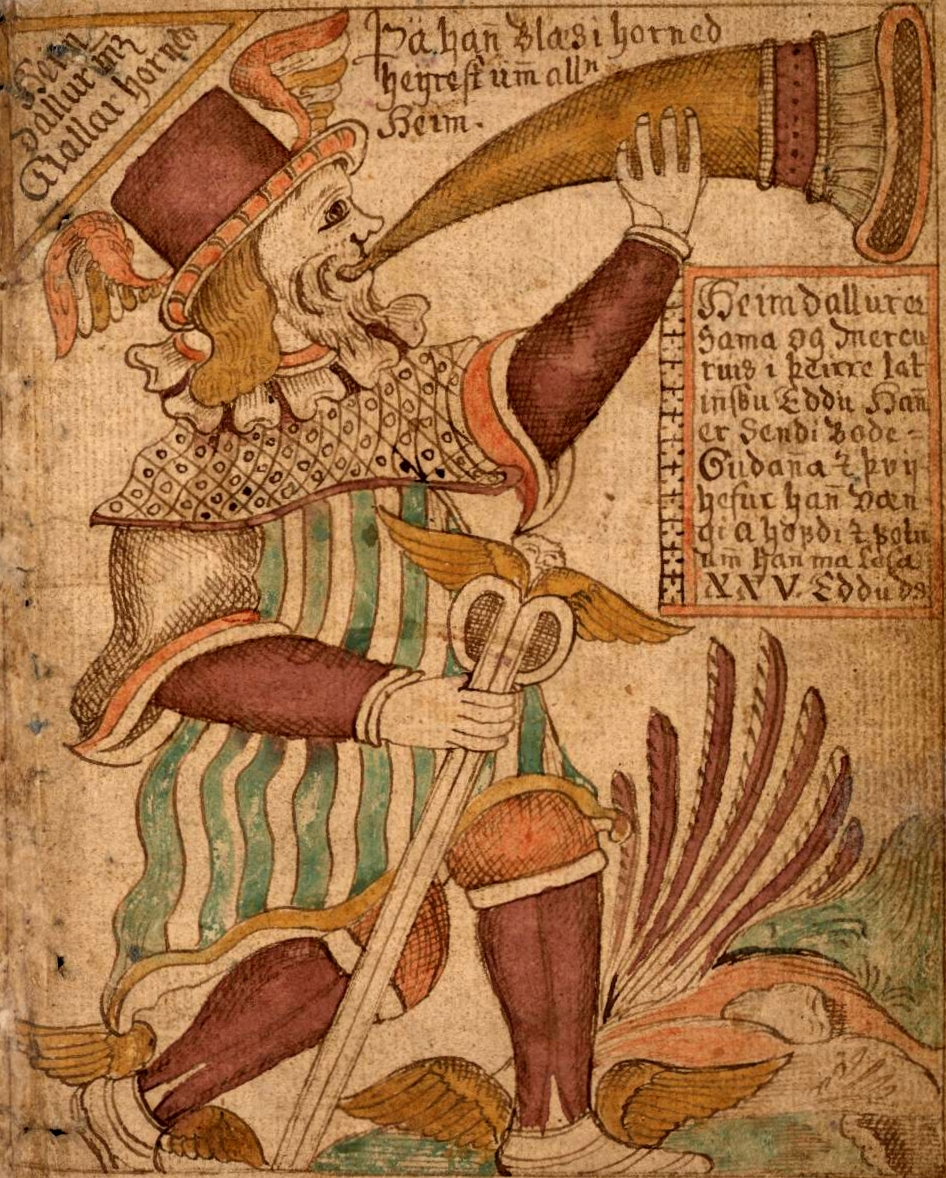
Heimdall

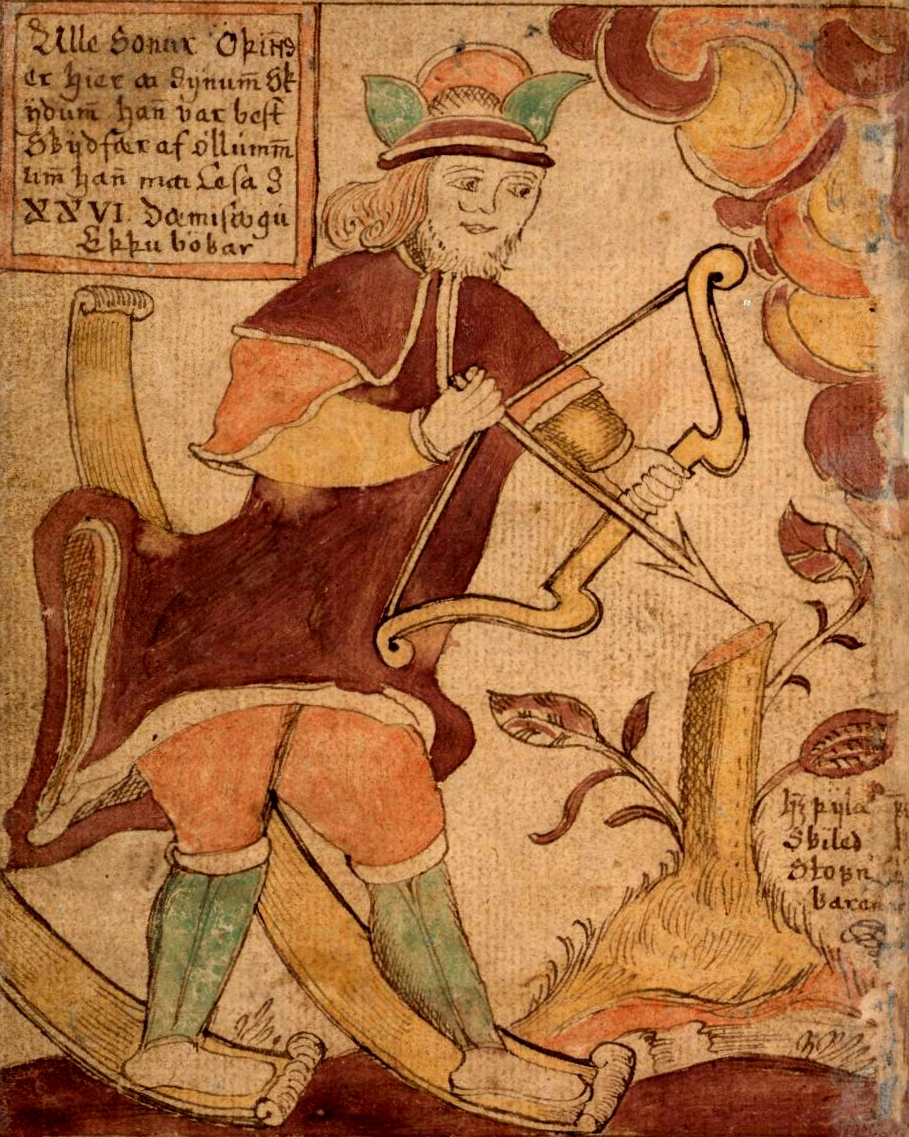
Ullr

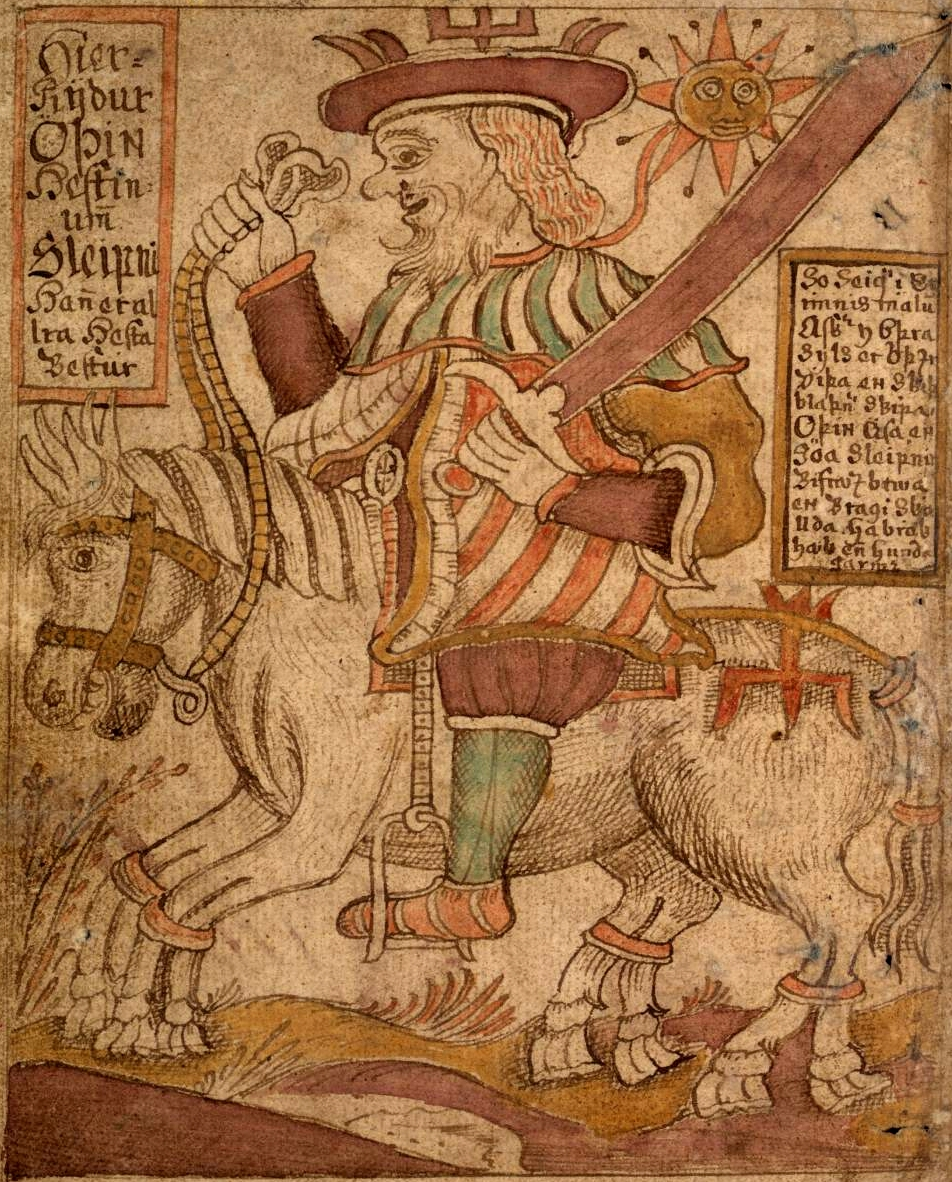
Odin riding Sleipnir

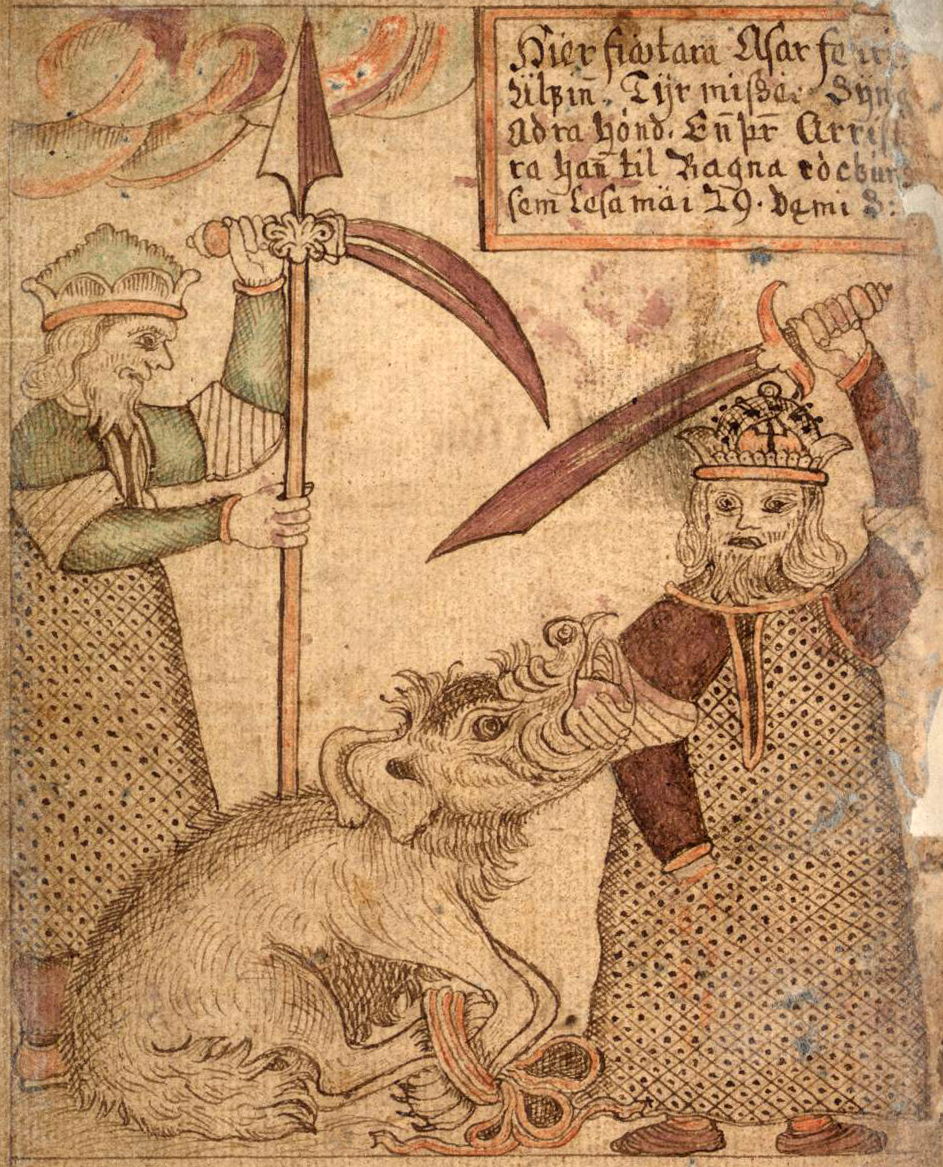
Fenrisulfr bites Týr's hand off.

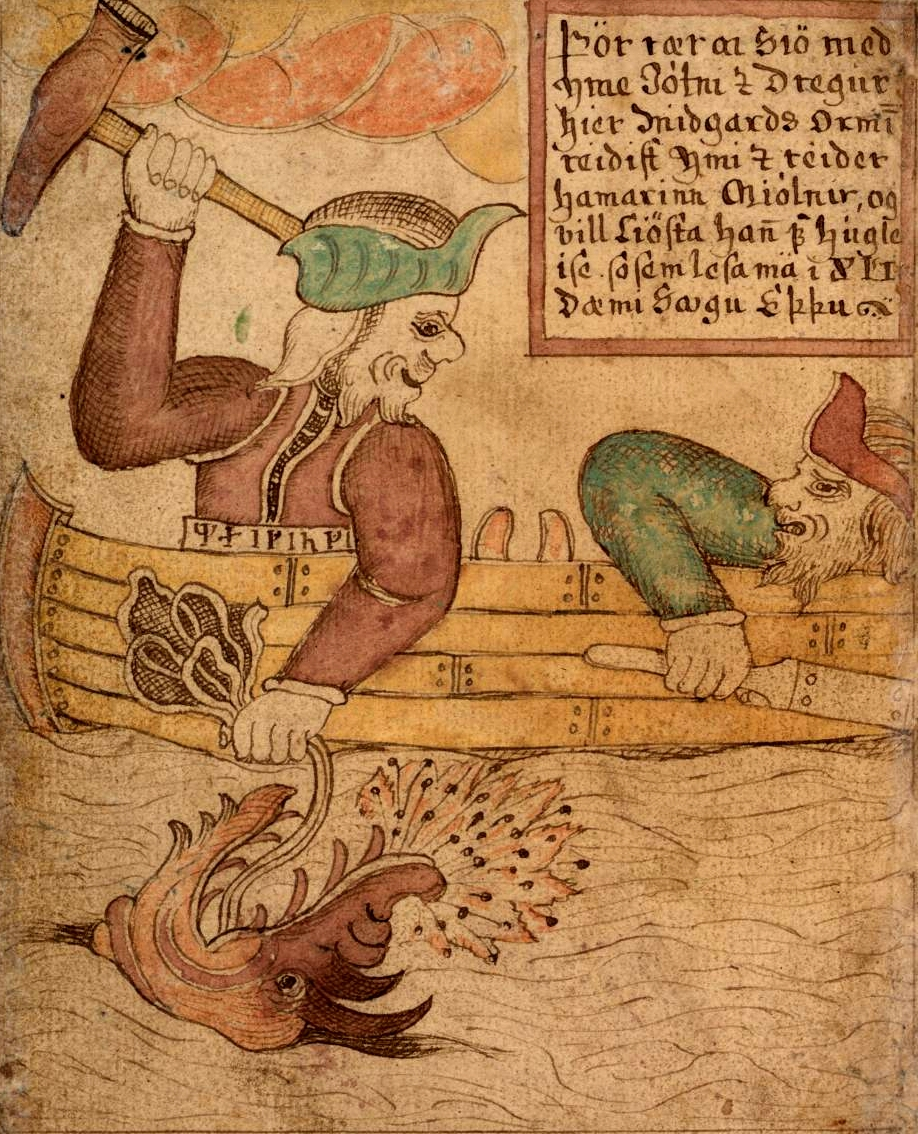
Thor and Hymir go fishing for the Midgard Serpent.

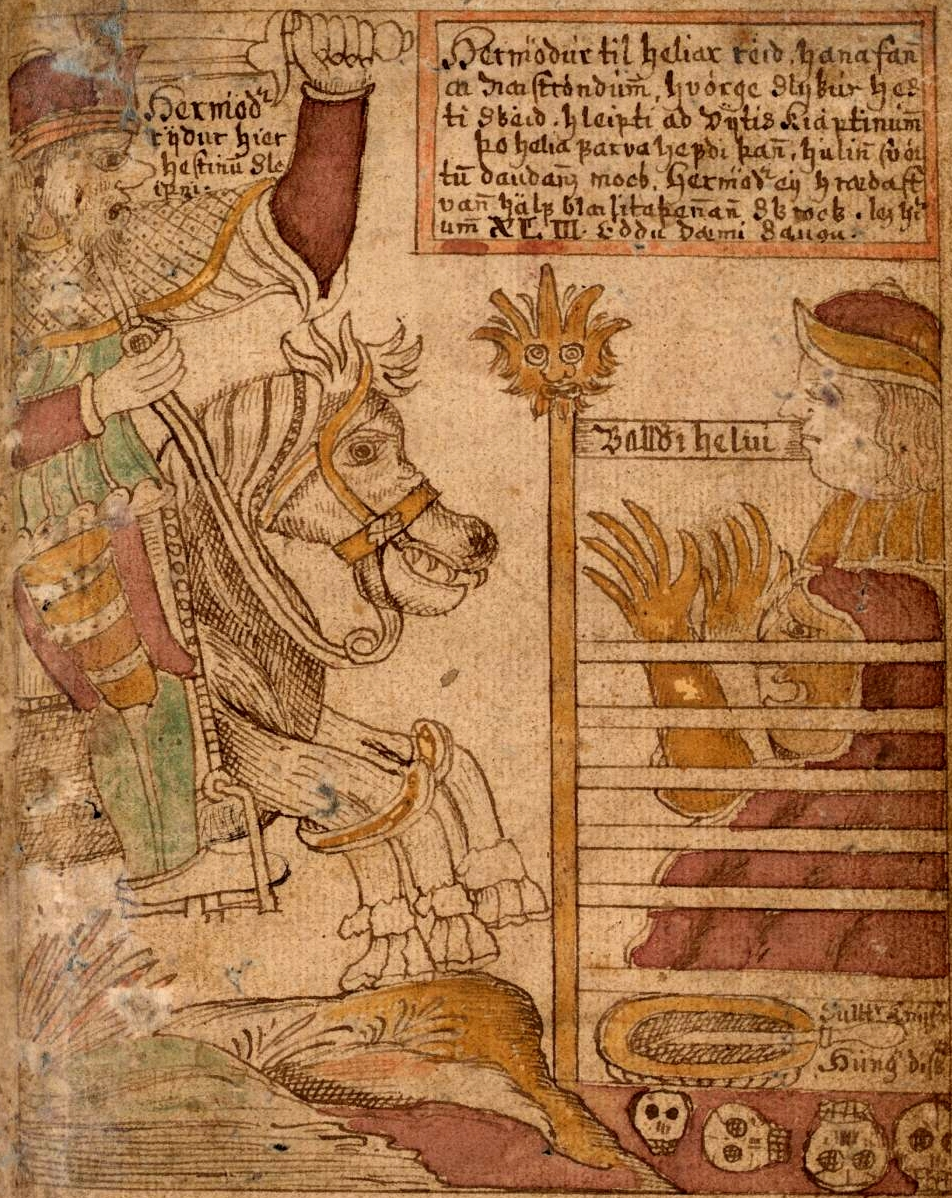
Hermod rides to Hel

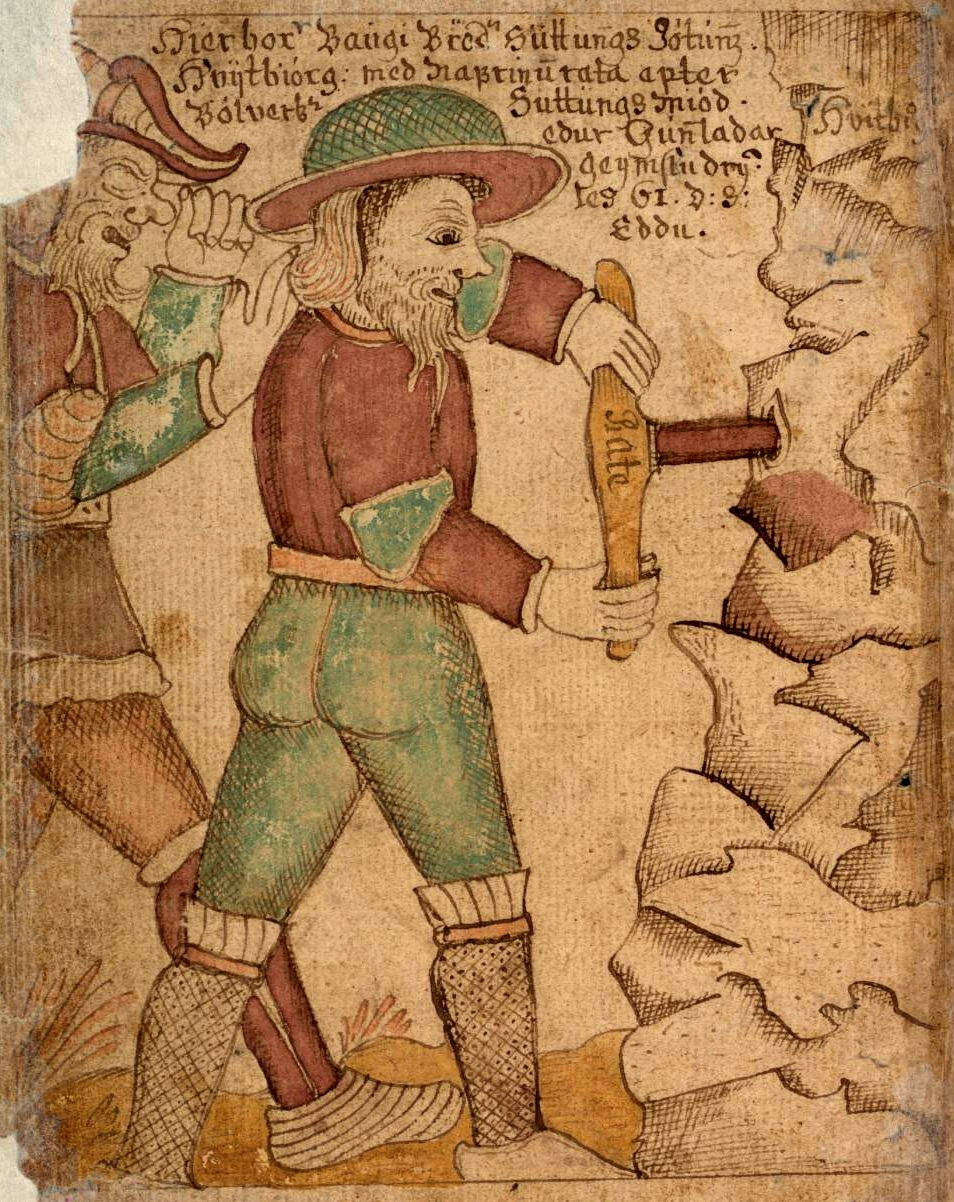
Odin gets Baugi to drill into the mountain to get at the mead of poetry.

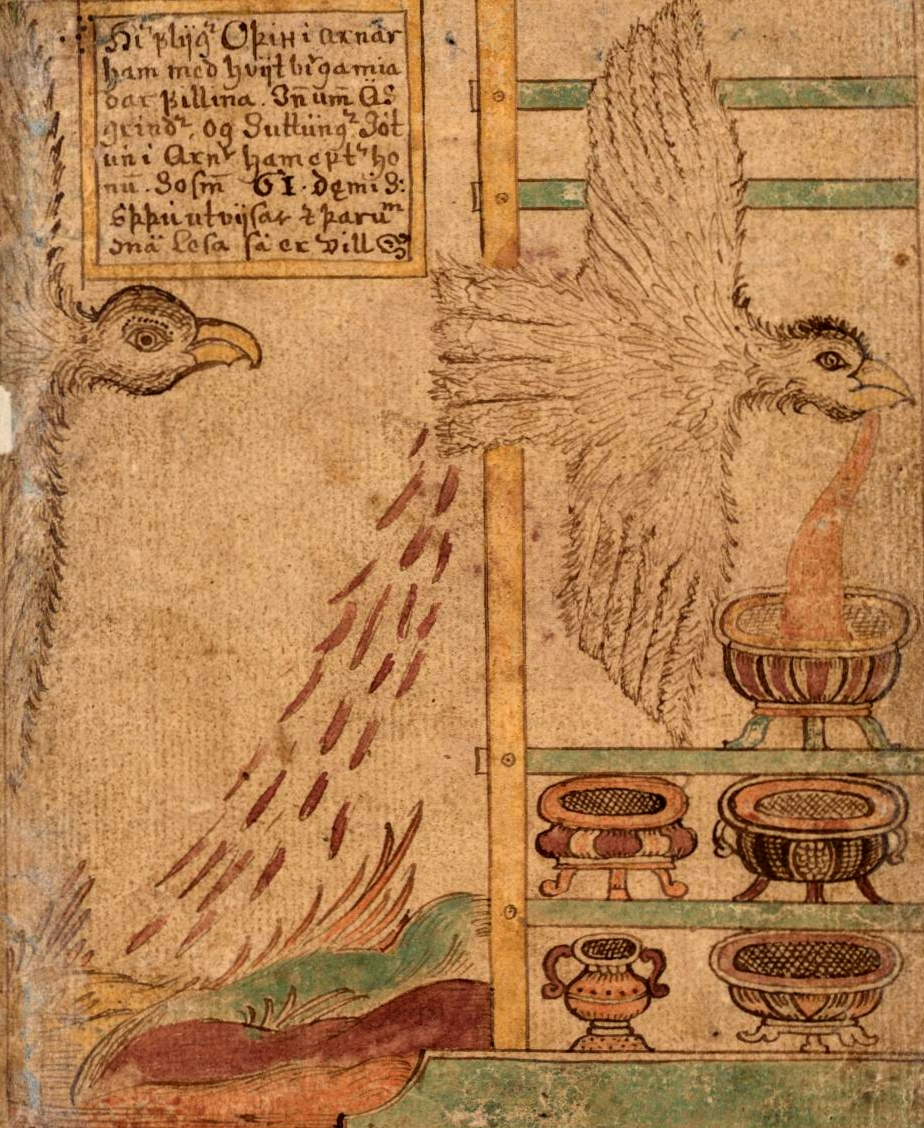
The mead of poetry is delivered

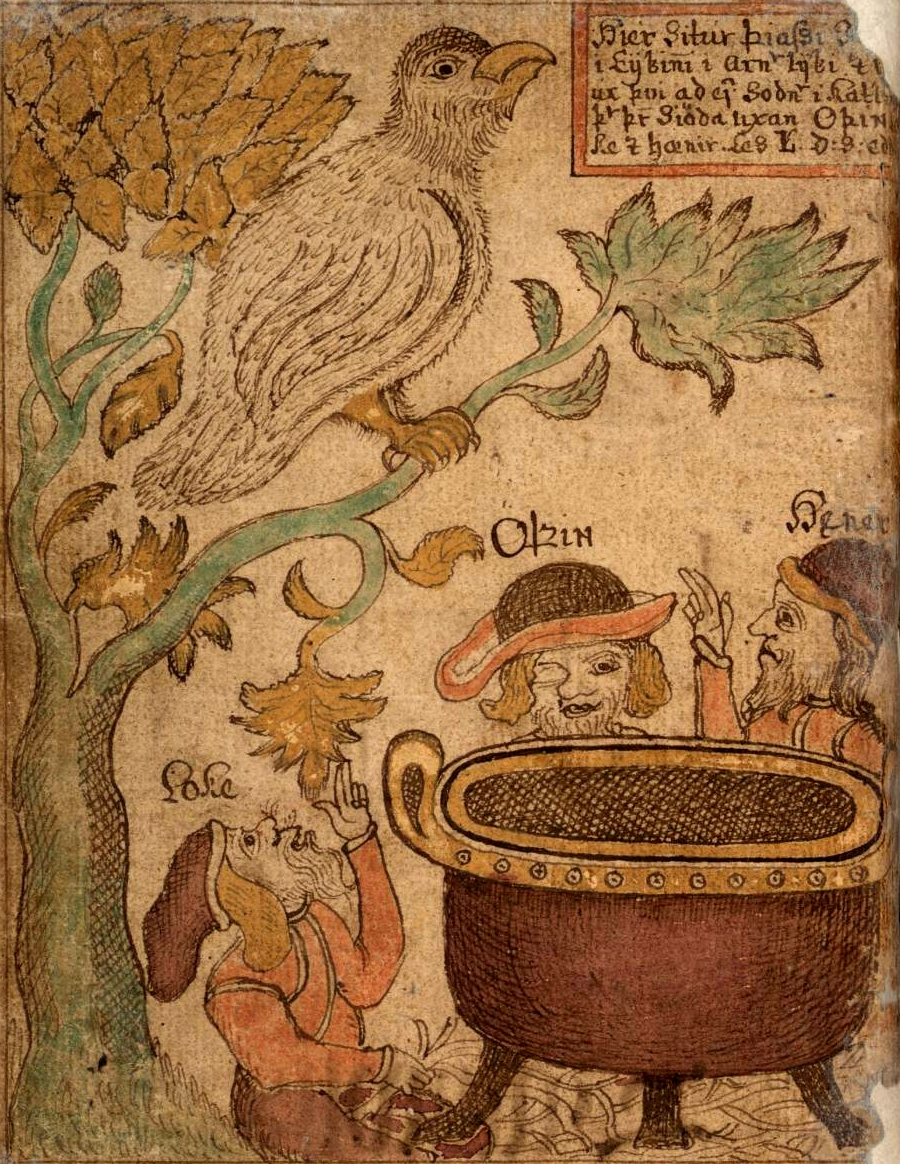
Three gods trying to boil some food as related in the Haustlöng.
