= Heiti =

Old Norse poetic device

A heiti (Old Norse heiti [hɛitɪ], Modern Icelandic [heiːtɪ], pl. heiti "name, appellation, designation, term") is a synonym used in Old Norse poetry in place of the normal word for something. For instance, Old Norse poets might use jór "steed" instead of the prosaic hestr "horse".

== Kennings ==
In the modern sense, heiti are distinguished from kennings in that a heiti is a simple word, whereas a kenning is a circumlocution in the form of a phrase or compound word; thus mækir is a heiti for "sword" (the usual word in prose is sverð), whereas grand hlífar "bane of shield" and ben-fúrr "wound-fire" are kennings for "sword".

However, Snorri Sturluson, writing in the 13th century, understood heiti in a broader sense that could include kennings. Snorri termed simple words, poetic or otherwise, ókend heiti "unqualified terms". These he distinguished from circumlocutions, kend heiti "qualified terms" (i.e., kennings).

== Types ==
Some heiti are words not normally found outside verse, e.g. fírar, one of numerous synonyms for menn "men, people". Others are common enough in prose but used by the poets in some specialised sense, such as salt "salt" to mean sjár "sea".

Heiti had a variety of origins. Some were archaic words: jór "steed", some loanwords: sinjór "lord" (from Latin senior, probably via Old French seignor). Several kinds of synecdoche and metonymy were employed: barð "part of the prow of a ship" for "ship" as a whole; gotnar "Goths" for "men" or "people" in general; targa "targe" (a type of shield) for "shield" in general; stál "steel" for "weapons, warfare". A few heiti were metaphorical: hríð "storm" for "attack, (onset of) battle". Some were originally proper names: Hrotti, Laufi, Mistilteinn and Tyrfingr were all swords owned by legendary heroes. There were also heiti for specific individuals, especially gods (e.g. Grímnir, Fjölnir, Viðrir and many more for Odin).

There were a great many heiti for certain concepts which the poets often dealt with, such as "man", "woman", "leader", and terms for weapons. Names of sækonungar "sea-kings" (legendary pirate leaders) constitute another large category. From these were formed kennings for "sea" and "ship", e.g. Rakna bifgrund "Rakni's shaking ground" = "the sea"; Þvinnils dýr "Thvinnil's beast" = "ship".

== Parallels ==
Analogous, and in some cases cognate terms, are found in the poetic traditions of other early Germanic languages, e.g. Old English guma, secg: Old Norse gumi, seggr "man"; Old English heoru, mēce: Old Norse hjǫrr, mækir "sword". Many other languages, ancient and modern, have possessed a specialised poetic vocabulary more or less removed from everyday speech, often derived in similar ways to Old Norse heiti.
