= Háttatal =

Section of Prose Edda

The Háttatal (Old Norse: 'Tally of Metres'; c. 20,000 words; Old Norse: [ˈhɑːtːɑtɑl], Modern Icelandic: [ˈhauhtaˌtʰaːl̥]) is the last section of the Prose Edda composed by the Icelandic poet, politician, and historian Snorri Sturluson. Using, for the most part, his own compositions, it exemplifies the types of verse forms used in Old Norse poetry. Snorri took a prescriptive as well as descriptive approach; he has systematized the material, and often notes that "the older poets did not always" follow his rules.

Most of the forms depend on number of syllables per line, as well as assonance, consonance, and alliteration. Although end rhyme is represented, it does not function in the ways most modern English speakers expect (forms include AAAAAAAA, and AAAABBBB), and plays a very minor role. Understanding this work will be much easier if the First Grammatical Treatise is also available to hand.

Many scholars have suggested that the form of Háttatal suggests a classical influence deriving from the traditions of Christian learning to which Snorri was doubtlessly exposed. Others have argued that this is a result of using a logical approach, within the framework of a dialog, and that some aspects of the work prove that it was not directly influenced by classical writings.

== See also ==
- Alliterative verse
- Old Norse poetry
- Skald
