= Galder (incantation) =

Germanic word for spell or incantation

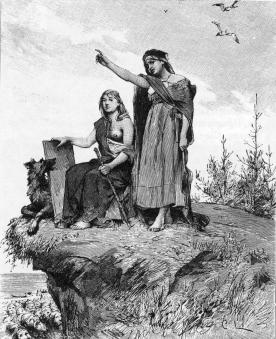
The völvas were pagan priestesses that specialized in chanting galdrs.

In old Germanic culture, a galder (lit. 'gale-der, yell-der'; Old English: ġealdor, galdor, Middle English: galder; Old Norse: galdr; Old High German: galdar, galstar), among other forms in old Germanic languages, refers to a spell or incantation; these were usually performed in combination with certain rites.

During the Middle Ages, the term galder often became synonymous with "witchcraft" and "magic" as a whole.

It was performed by both women and men. Some scholars have proposed they chanted it in falsetto (gala).

== Etymology ==
Proto-West Germanic
Proto-North Germanic
- Old English: galdor, ġealdor, ȝealdor
  - Middle English: galder
    - English: galder (learned)
- Old High German: galstar, galdar, kalter
  - Middle High German: galster
    - German: Galsterei
- Old West Norse: galdʀ
  - Classical Old Norse: galdr
    - Faroese: galdur
    - Icelandic: galdur
    - Nynorsk: galder, (dialectal) galler, gauller, (Note: Nord-Rana Municipality) gall (Note: Forsand Municipality)
- Old East Norse: galdʀ
  - Old Danish: galder
    - Danish: galder
  - Old Swedish: galder, galdher (ᚵᛆᛚᚦᚽᚱ), gallir
    - Swedish: galder, (dialectal) galler, gaullder

Galder essentially equates to "gale-der", or "yell-der", denoting something of galing (yelling, crying, singing). Descendants are derived from a reconstructed Proto-Germanic *galdraz, meaning a song or incantation. The terms are also related by the removal of an Indo-European -tro suffix to the verbs Old Norse: gala and Old English: galan, Modern English gale, both derived from Proto-Germanic *galaną ("to sing or cast a spell"). In Old High German the -stro suffix produced galstar instead, becomming Middle High German galster ("song, enchantment").

It also exist as a verb – "to galder" ("to sing or yell magic charms or spells", "to bewitch"):

- Old Norse: galdra
  - Icelandic: galdra
  - Nynorsk: galdra, galdre, (dialectal) gallra, galler
  - Old Danish: *galdræ
    - Danish: galdre
  - Old Swedish: galdra, galra
    - Swedish: galdra, (dialectal) gallra, gaulldra
- Norn: *gáldra → *gąlðer?
  - Shaetlan: galder, gaalder; golder, gulder
  - Orcadian: galder, gaalder; golder, geoldar
  - Low Scots: golder, goldar, guldar, gulder; galler, galor, goller, gollar, gollor, guller, gullar
  - Ulster Scots: guldher, gulder

Descendants of the verb, beyond envoking magic, often envoke yelling or bad singing. Descendants in Norwegian features senses like "to bawl, scream, shout, caw, whine, roar (without reason, often about children)", "to sing badly and loudly (without words)", "to scold". Descendants in Shetlandic and Orcadian – galder, gaalder – features senses like "loud noisy laugh, chatter, yelling; clatter (of tongues)", "to talk or sing boisterously/foolishly", "to gurgle", as well as "roaring wind", etc. Descendants in broader Scots – goller, golder – features senses like "to roar, shout, howl, bawl", "to speak thickly and vehemently or threateningly, to scold", "to laugh noisily, to growl, bark violently"; also noise of a "roaring wind", etc.

The Modern Scandinavian word for "crazy" (Danish: gal, Norwegian: gal, Swedish: galen) is a derivative of the same root as galder, and originally referred to someone whose mind has been distorted by a spell. Other related descendants of these words are, Icelandic: að gala ("to sing, call out, yell"), Swedish: gala ("to yell, crowing of a rooster"), the latter component of English nightingale (from nihtegale), related to ġiellan, the verb ancestral to Modern English yell, also cognate with Dutch gillen ("to yell, scream").

=== Derivatives ===
Various derivatives of galder exist, often terms for witch:

- Old English: gealdricge – lit. 'galder-ich'
- Old Norse: galdrakona – lit. 'galder-quean'
  - Old Swedish: galderkona, gallirkona
- German: Galsterweib – lit. 'galder wife'

In Icelandic, the term galdrabók, lit. 'galder book' ("spell book"), has been a term for grimoire.

== Attestations ==
=== Old Norse ===
Some incantations were composed in a special meter named galdralag. This meter was similar to the six-lined ljóðaháttr, also used for ritual, but added at least one more C-line. Diverse runic inscriptions suggest informal impromptu methods. Another characteristic is a performed parallelism, see the stanza from Skirnismál, below.

A practical galder for women was one that made childbirth easier, but they were also notably used for bringing madness onto another person, whence modern Swedish galen meaning "mad", derived from the verb gala ('to sing, perform a galder'). Moreover, a master of the craft was also said to be able to raise storms, make distant ships sink, make swords blunt, make armour soft and decide victory or defeat in battles. Examples of this can be found in Grógaldr and in Frithiof's Saga. In Grógaldr, Gróa chants nine (a significant number in Norse mythology) galders to aid her son, and in Buslubœn, the schemes of king Ring of Östergötland are averted.

It is also mentioned in several of the poems in the Poetic Edda, and for instance in Hávamál, where Odin claims to know 18 galders. For instance, Odin mastered galders against fire, sword edges, arrows, fetters and storms, and he could conjure up the dead and speak to them. There are other references in Skírnismál, where Skirnir uses galders to force Gerðr to marry Freyr as exemplified by the following stanza:

34. Heyri jötnar,
heyri hrímþursar,
synir Suttungs,
sjalfir ásliðar,
hvé ek fyrbýð,
hvé ek fyrirbanna
manna glaum mani,
manna nyt mani.

Translation:

34. "Give heed, frost-rulers,
hear it, giants.
Sons of Suttung,
And gods, ye too,
How I forbid
and how I ban
The meeting of men with the maid,
(The joy of men with the maid.)

A notable reference to the use of galders is the eddic poem Oddrúnargrátr, where Borgny could not give birth before Oddrún had chanted "biting galders" (but they are translated as potent charms, by Henry Adams Bellows below):

7. Þær hykk mæltu
þvígit fleira,
gekk mild fyr kné
meyju at sitja;
ríkt gól Oddrún,
rammt gól Oddrún,
bitra galdra
at Borgnýju.

8. Knátti mær ok mögr
moldveg sporna,
börn þau in blíðu
við bana Högna;
þat nam at mæla
mær fjörsjúka,
svá at hon ekki kvað
orð it fyrra:

9. "Svá hjalpi þér
hollar véttir,
Frigg ok Freyja
ok fleiri goð,
sem þú feldir mér
fár af höndum."

Translation:

6. Then no more
they spake, methinks;
She went at the knees
of the woman to sit;
With magic Oddrun
and mightily Oddrun
Chanted for Borgny
potent charms.

7. At last were born
a boy and girl,
Son and daughter
of Hogni's slayer;
Then speech the woman
so weak began,
Nor said she aught
ere this she spake:

8. "So may the holy
ones thee help,
Frigg and Freyja
and favoring gods,
As thou hast saved me
from sorrow now."

=== Old English ===
In Beowulf, ġealdru are used to protect the dragon's hoard that was buried in a barrow:

Him big stódan bunan ond orcas
discas lágon ond dýre swyrd
ómige þurhetone swá híe wið eorðan fæðm
þúsend wintra þaér eardodon,
þonne wæs þæt yrfe éacencræftig,
iúmonna gold galdre bewunden
þæt ðám hringsele hrínan ne móste
gumena aénig nefne god sylfa
sigora sóðcyning sealde þám ðe hé wolde
--hé is manna gehyld-- hord openian·
efne swá hwylcum manna swá him gemet ðúhte.

— Old English text
Translation:

Beside them goblets and ewers stood,
and dishes lay and precious swords,
rusty and eaten through, as had they dwelt there
a thousand winters in the earth's embrace.
In that day that heritage had been endowed with mighty power;
gold of bygone men was wound with spells,
so that none among them might lay a hand upon that hall of rings,
unless God himself,
true King of Victories, granted to the man
he chose the enchanter's secret and the hoard top open,
to even such among men as seemed meet to Him.

— Tolkien Translation

== Signed galders ==
=== Runic galders ===
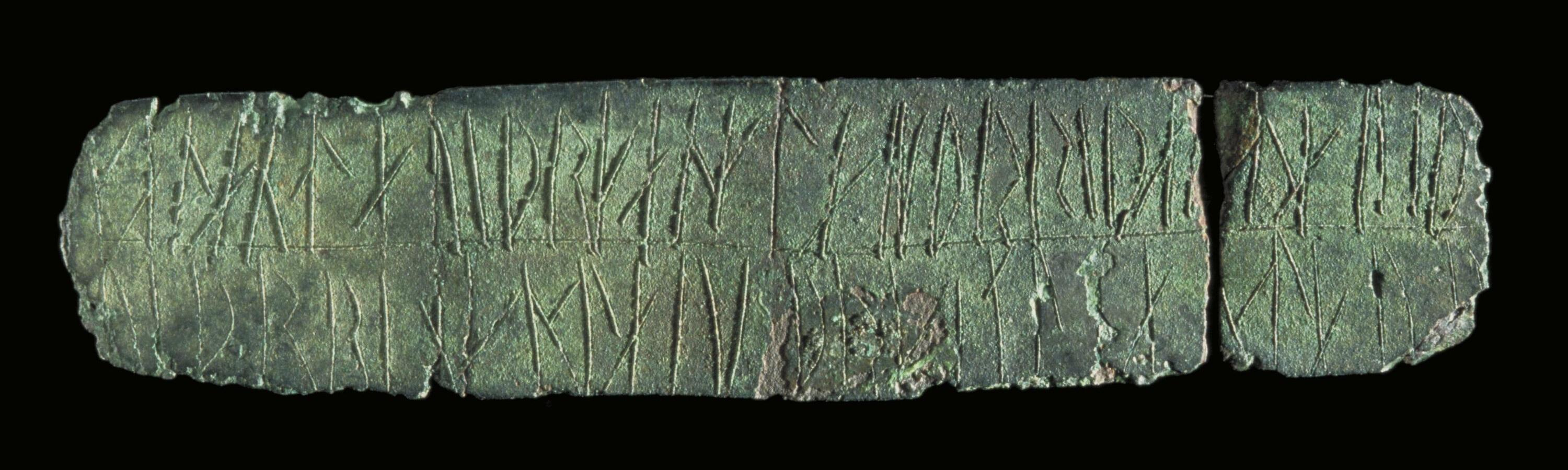
The runic galder on the Högstena bronze plate (Vg 216).

During the Viking Age, there exist finds of galders written in runes, so-called runic galders (Swedish: rungalder), in addition to other forms of runic magic. Runic galders are found, among other things, written down on rune sticks (runstickor), or on rune plates (runbleck), such as the one on the 12th century Högstena bronze plate (Vg 216).

The Högstena runic galder roughly goes:

Runic Swedish:

Gal anda viðr, gangla viðr, riðanda viðr, viðr rinnanda, viðr s[it]ianda, viðr sign[and]a, viðr f[a]randa, viðr fliuganda. S[kal] allt fy[r]na ok um døy[i]a.

Translation:

(I) practice witchcraft against the spirit, against the walking (spirit), against the riding, against the running, against the sitting, against the sinking, against the travelling, against the flying. Everything shall lose its vitality and die.

=== Galder letters ===
In Medieval Scandinavia, a drawn or written spell or incantation was called a "galder letter" (Old Swedish: galdra breff, Swedish: galdrabrev, roughly "written spell"). Such, intended to make the holder invulnerable, especially against cuts and thrusts, could be worn as an amulet and was called a "sword letter" (Old Swedish: swærdhbref, Swedish: svärdsbrev; Old Danish: sværdbrev, Danish: sværdbrev, Norwegian: sverdbrev; Middle Low German: swertbref). Such could be worn around the neck, in a pocket, or in the hilt of a sword. Danish renaissance era sources mentions such using both regular and runic letters, as well as symbols, and could also be used against various illness and misfortune.

This type of signed galder was later banned or spoken against of, especially with the Reformation, which spoke against the use of symbolism and other wordly objects for supernatural aid. An excerpt from the manuscript Själens tröst (Old Swedish: Sjælinna Thrøst), written around 1430, says the following:

- Thu skalt ey thro oppa hantzal
- Ey oppa swerdhbreff
- ellir annor galdra breff

Translation:

- You shall not believe upon gifts,
- neither upon sword letters
- or other galder letters.

In 1526, Dane Poul Helgesen, translated some of Martin Luther's writings, and where Luther spoke out against the use of letters for supernatural protection, Helgesen used the term sword letter.

Om wy bruge swerdtbreff, tegen, yrther, ordt, wyelsse, och andhen saadan tingh, som i then menningh icke andhet ære, endt sandt troldom, forthij ther settis loffwe till thennom, oc missloffue till Gudt.

Translation:

If we use sword letters, symbols, incense, words, blessings, and other such things, which in that sense are nothing other than true sorcery; for by such is praise given to those things, and insult to God.

=== Galder sigils ===
There exist records from the 16th century of Icelandic Medieval magic sigils called "galder staves" (Icelandic: galdrastafir, roughly "incantation staves"), today commonly referred to as Icelandic magical staves in English. Such are popular with neopagans and New Age folk.

Famous examples includes the Ægishjálmur and Vegvísir.

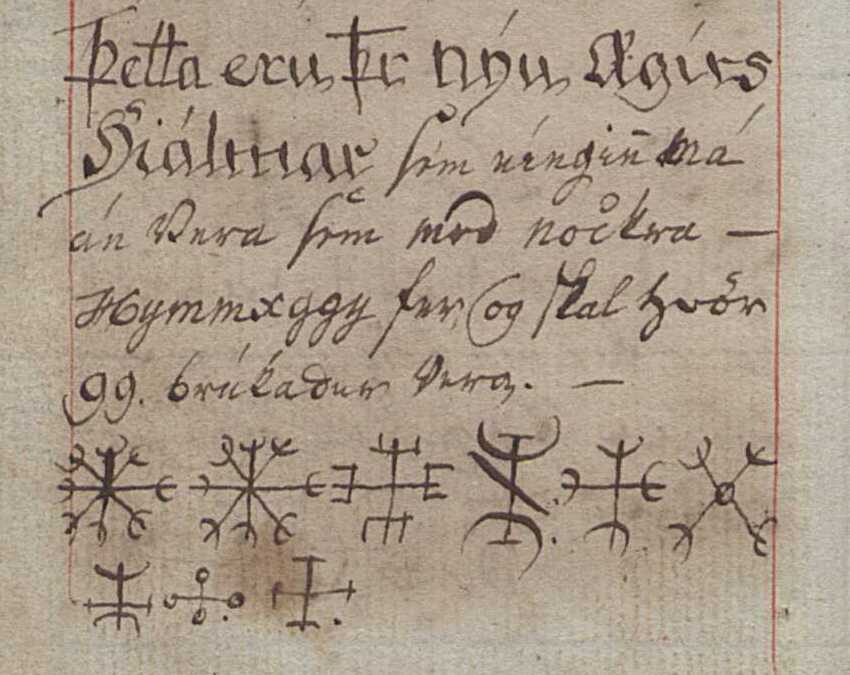
Excerpt of Icelandic galder staves from the manuscript LBS 2413 8vo (c. 1800).

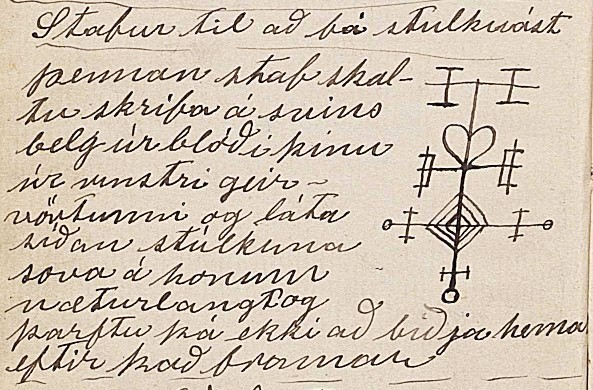
Excerpt of Icelandic galder staves from the manuscript LBS 4375 8vo (1924 copy of a 1676 original).

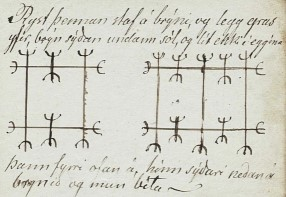
Excerpt of Icelandic galder staves from the manuscript LBS 4627 8vo (c. 1870).

== See also ==
- Grógaldr
- Runic magic
- Icelandic magical staves
- Seiðr
- Norito
- Dharani

== Bibliography ==
- Schön, Ebbe. (2004). Asa-Tors hammare, Gudar och jättar i tro och tradition. Fält & Hässler, Värnamo. ISBN 91-89660-41-2.
- Steinsland, G. & Meulengracht Sørensen, P. (1998): Människor och makter i vikingarnas värld. ISBN 91-7324-591-7.
