= Milk thief =

Milk thief may refer to:

- The Milk Thief, a 1998 book of poetry by Paul Henry
- Tilberi (AKA snakkur), a witches' familiar and milk thief in Icelandic folklore
- Troll cat (AKA milk rabbit, troll ball), a witches' familiar and milk thief in Scandinavian folklore

== See also ==
- Catching the Milk Thief, an 1899 film by Bamforth & Co Ltd
