= Museum of Sorcery and Witchcraft =

Museum in Iceland

Coordinates: 65.7064°N 21.6656°W

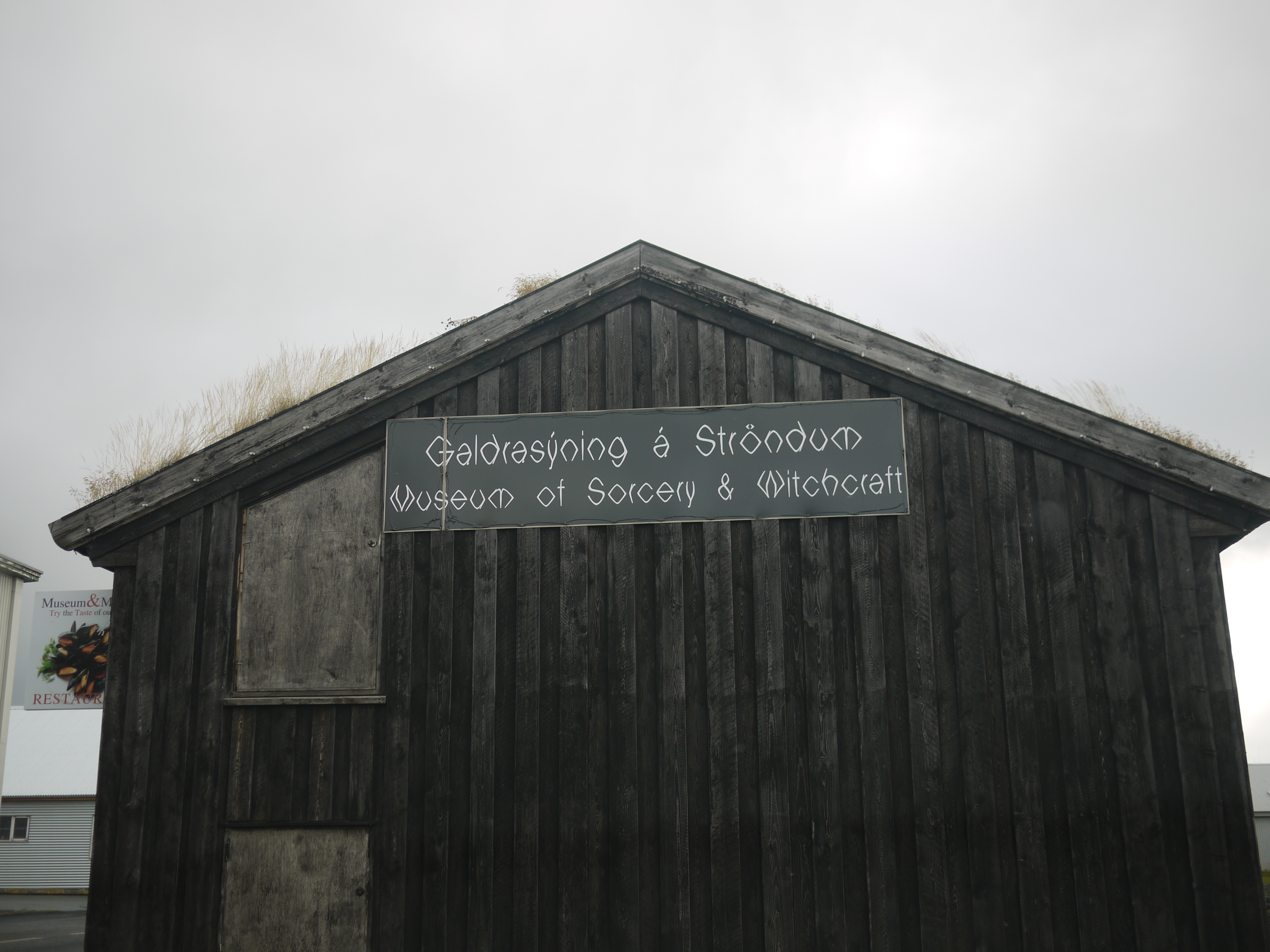
The exterior of Galdrasýning, the Museum of Icelandic Sorcery and Witchcraft in Hólmavík, Iceland.

The Museum of Sorcery and Witchcraft (Icelandic Galdrasýning á Ströndum) is a privately operated and publicly accessible museum dedicated to the folklore and history of sorcery and witchcraft in Iceland. It is run by Strandagaldur (Icelandic pronunciation: [ˈstrantaˌkaltʏr̥]). First opened in June 2000, and curated by Sigurður Atlason (d. 2018), the museum is located in the coastal town Hólmavík. Based on research which began in 1996, the museum contains various permanent and special exhibitions on subjects such as the Nábrók (or necropants) Icelandic magical staves, Tilberi, and Icelandic grimoires. An upstairs area focuses on the history of witch hunts in Iceland, and the genealogy of witches and their accusers. A note invites visitors to consider how they might be related to the historical figures.

== Restaurant Galdur ==
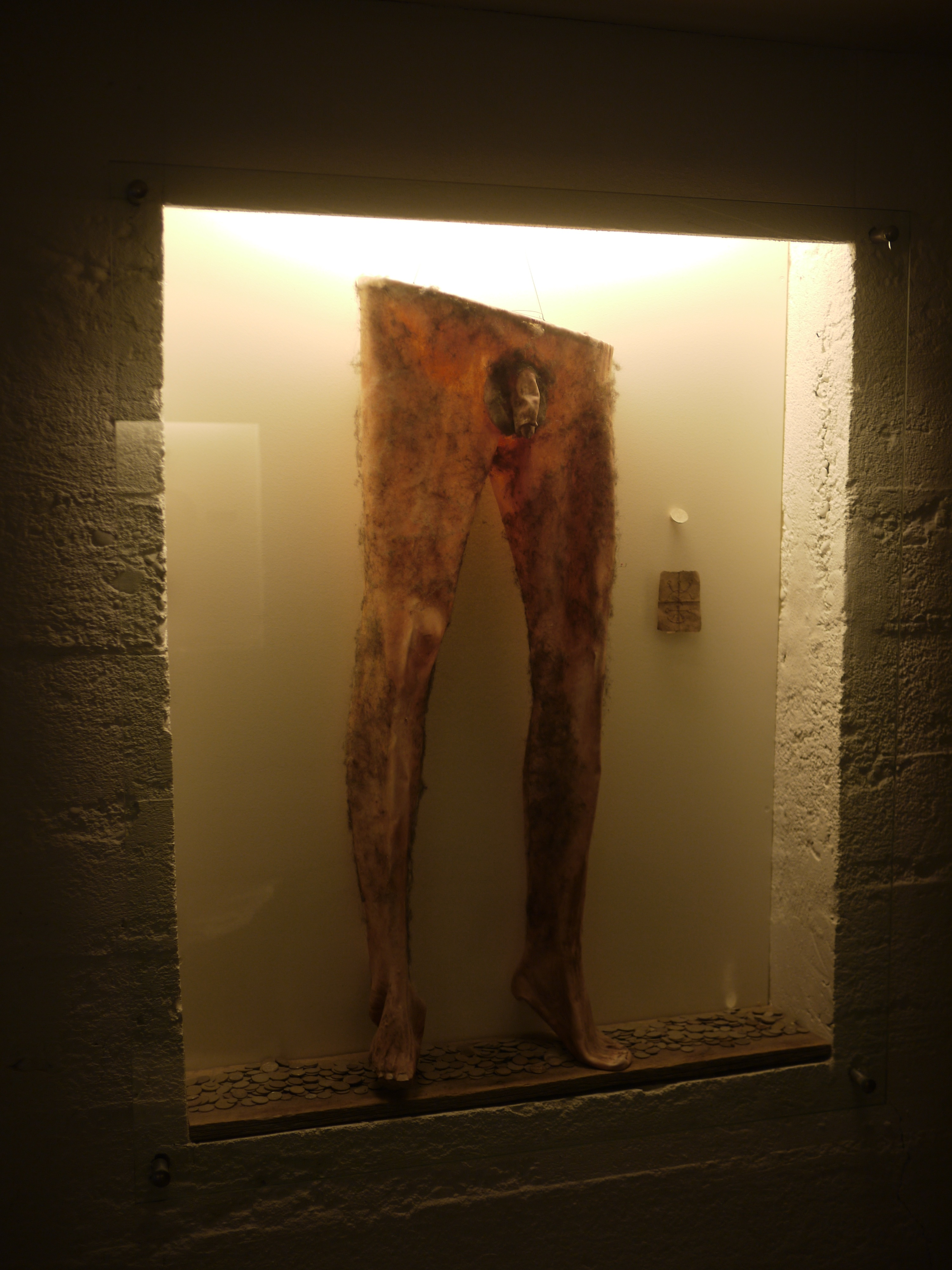
A replica of Nábrók (necropants) on display at Strandagaldur

Restaurant Galdur is the restaurant located within the museum, offering meatsoup, seafood soup, and beef steak as well as a vegetarian and vegan option, plus a variety of beer, coffee, and wine.
