= Huginn and Muninn =

Pair of ravens in Norse mythology that serve Odin

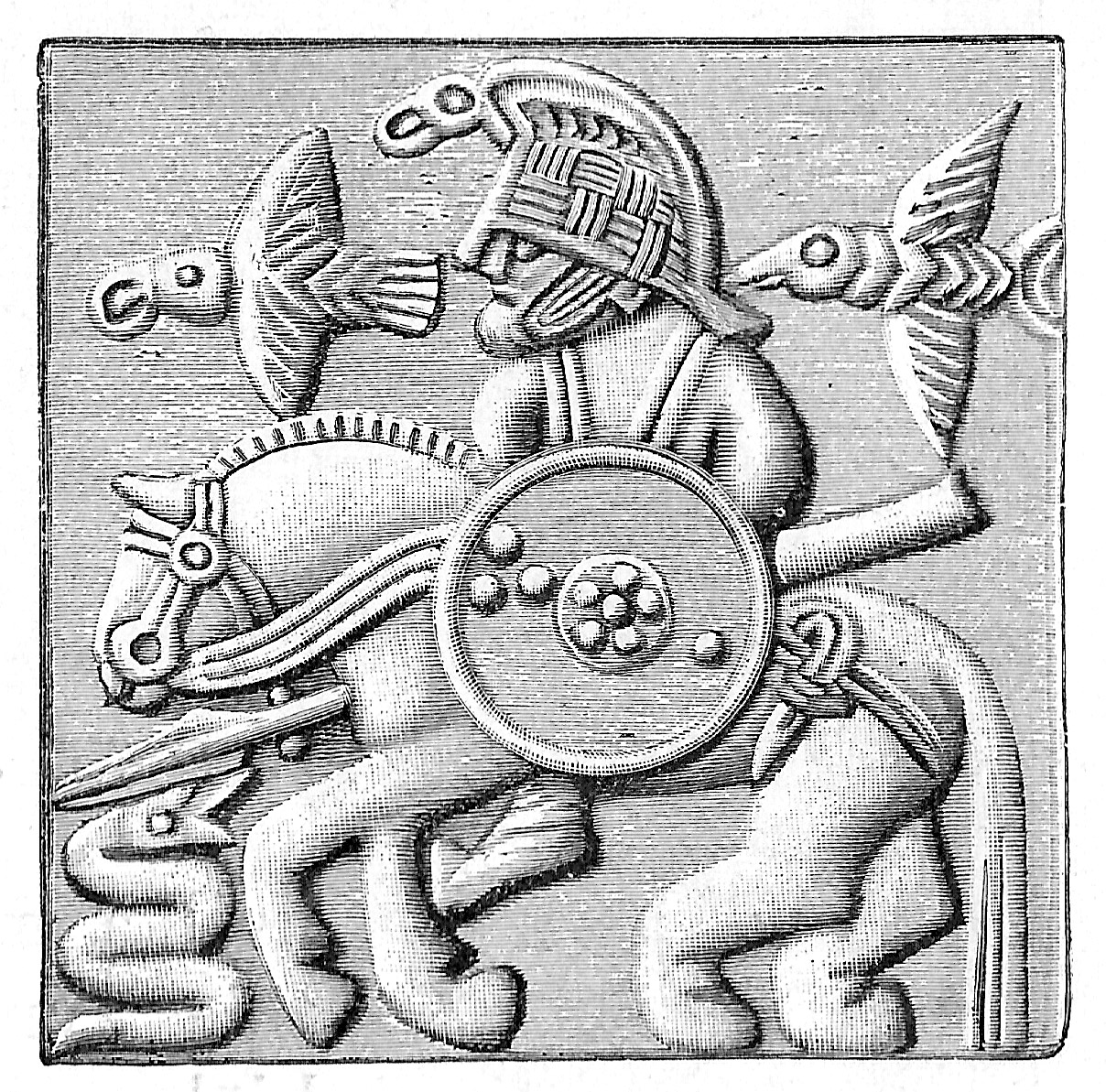
A plate from a Vendel era helmet featuring a figure riding a horse, holding a spear and shield, and confronted by a serpent, accompanied by two birds. The image has been thought to depict Odin with his horse Sleipnir and his spear Gungnir with Huginn and Muninn flying above

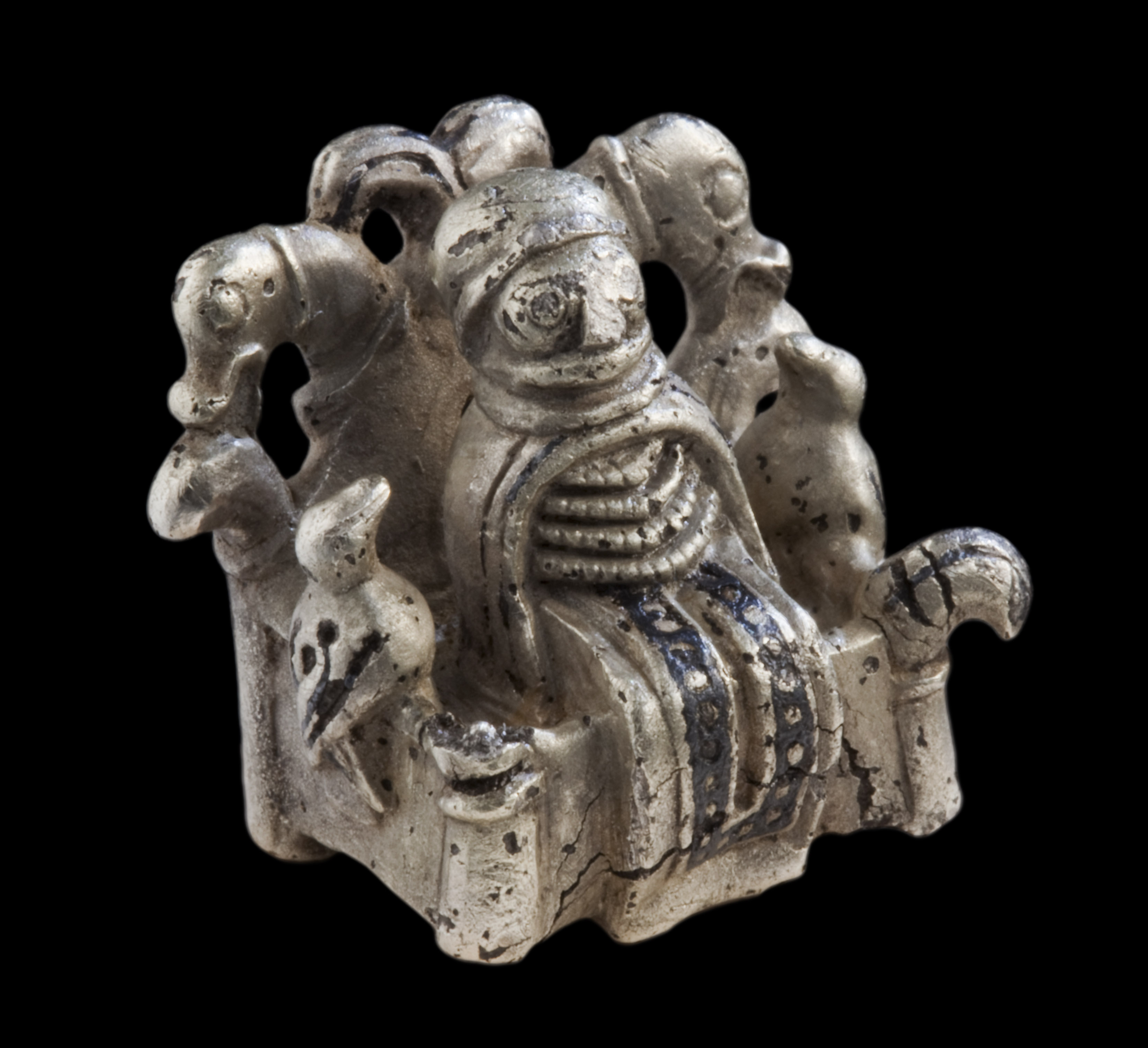
A statuette of Odin on his throne flanked by Huginn and Muninn, Lejre, Denmark, 10th century

In Norse mythology, Huginn and Muninn (sometimes anglicized as Hugin and Munin; /ˈhuːɡɪn, ˈmuːnɪn/ or /ˈhjuːɡɪn, ˈmjuːnɪn/; roughly "mind and will" – see § Etymology) are a pair of ravens that serve under the god Odin, flying around the world (Midgard) and bringing him information and gossip. Huginn and Muninn are attested in the Poetic Edda, compiled in the 13th century from earlier traditional sources: the Prose Edda and Heimskringla; in the Third Grammatical Treatise, compiled in the 13th century by Óláfr Þórðarson; and in the poetry of skalds.

In the Poetic Edda, a disguised Odin expresses that he fears the ravens may not return from their daily flights. The Prose Edda explains that Odin is referred to as Hrafnaguð (Old Norse: [ˈhrɑvnɑˌɡuð]; "raven-god") due to his association with Huginn and Muninn. In the Prose Edda and the Third Grammatical Treatise, the two ravens are described as perching on Odin's shoulders. Heimskringla details that Odin gave Huginn and Muninn the ability to speak.

Examples of artifacts that may depict Odin with one of the ravens include Migration Period golden bracteates, Vendel era helmet plates, a pair of identical Germanic Iron Age bird-shaped brooches, Viking Age objects depicting a moustached man wearing a helmet, and a portion of the 10th or 11th century Thorwald's Cross. Huginn and Muninn's role as Odin's messengers has been linked to shamanic practices, the Norse raven banner, general raven symbolism among the Germanic peoples, and the Norse concepts of the fylgja and the hamingja.

== Etymology ==
On the surface, the names Huginn and Muninn represent Odin's sense and mind. Their names are definitive singular forms of words which encompass various related but abstract senses. As an example, the English word mind is based on the same root word as Muninn, but encompasses the sense of Huginn when used as a noun, yet with the sense of Muninn when used as a verb. The exact clear definitions and intentions behind these names are hard to extrapolate, but they were probably close to synonyms with several shared and bordering senses.

Huginn is the definite accusative singular of Old Norse: hugr (see Hug (folklore); modern Danish: hug, hu; Icelandic: hugur; Norwegian: hug; Old Swedish: hugher, hogher; modern Swedish: håg). It encompasses the complex meaning of mind and sense, such as "thought, perception, comprehension, awareness, mood, sentiment, desire, choice etc". Cognates include Middle English: hige (with variants: huȝe, huiȝe, hiȝe, huie, hiȝ, hie), Old English: hyge, hiġe; Old Saxon: hugi; Middle Dutch: hoghe; Dutch: heug; Gothic: hugs; Old High German: hugu, hugi; with the same meaning.

Muninn is the definite accusative singular of Old Norse: munr (modern Danish: mon; Icelandic: munur; Norwegian: monn; Old Swedish: mon, mun; modern Swedish: mån). It encompasses the complex meaning of affection, intent and will, such as "care, urge, yearn, strive, wonder, curiosity, interest, memory, prediction etc". Cognates include Old English: myne; Gothic: muns; Middle High German: mun; with the same meaning, as well as English: mind and Old English: gemynd ("memory, mind").

== Attestations ==
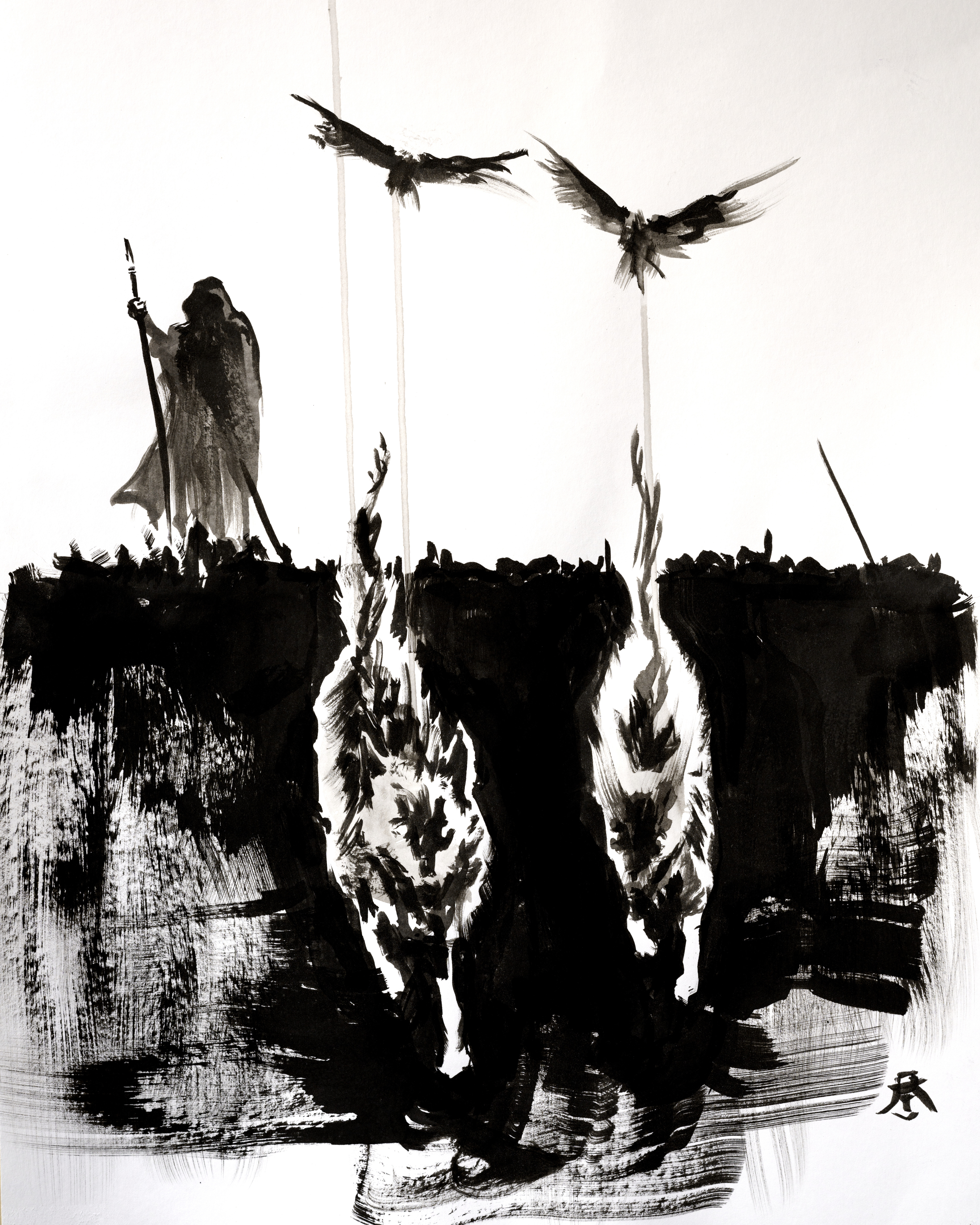
Modern ambiguous ink painting of Odin with his two ravens Huginn and Muninn, as well as his two wolves Geri and Freki

In the Poetic Edda poem Grímnismál, the god Odin (disguised as Grímnir) provides the young Agnarr with information about Odin's companions. He tells the prince about Odin's wolves Geri and Freki, and, in the next stanza of the poem, states that Huginn and Muninn fly daily across the entire world, Midgard. Grímnir says that he worries Huginn may not come back, yet more does he fear for Muninn:

Benjamin Thorpe translation:
Hugin and Munin fly each day
over the spacious earth.
I fear for Hugin, that he come not back,
yet more anxious am I for Munin.

Henry Adams Bellows translation:
O'er Mithgarth Hugin and Munin both
Each day set forth to fly;
For Hugin I fear lest he come not home,
But for Munin my care is more.

In the Prose Edda book Gylfaginning (chapter 38), the enthroned figure of High tells Gangleri (king Gylfi in disguise) that two ravens named Huginn and Muninn sit on Odin's shoulders. The ravens tell Odin everything they see and hear. Odin sends Huginn and Muninn out at dawn, and the birds fly all over the world before returning at dinner-time. As a result, Odin is kept informed of many events. High adds that it is from this association that Odin is referred to as "raven-god". The above-mentioned stanza from Grímnismál is then quoted.

In the Prose Edda book Skáldskaparmál (chapter 60), Huginn and Muninn appear in a list of poetic names for ravens. In the same chapter, excerpts from a work by the skald Einarr Skúlason are provided. In these excerpts Muninn is referenced in a common noun for 'raven' and Huginn is referenced in a kenning for 'carrion'.

In the Heimskringla book Ynglinga saga, a euhemerized account of the life of Odin is provided. Chapter 7 describes that Odin had two ravens, and upon these ravens he bestowed the gift of speech. These ravens flew all over the land and brought him information, causing Odin to become "very wise in his lore."

In the Third Grammatical Treatise an anonymous verse is recorded that mentions the ravens flying from Odin's shoulders; Huginn seeking hanged men, and Muninn slain bodies. The verse reads:

Two ravens flew from Hnikar’s [Óðinn’s]
shoulders; Huginn to the hanged and
Muninn to the slain [lit. corpses].

== Archaeological record ==
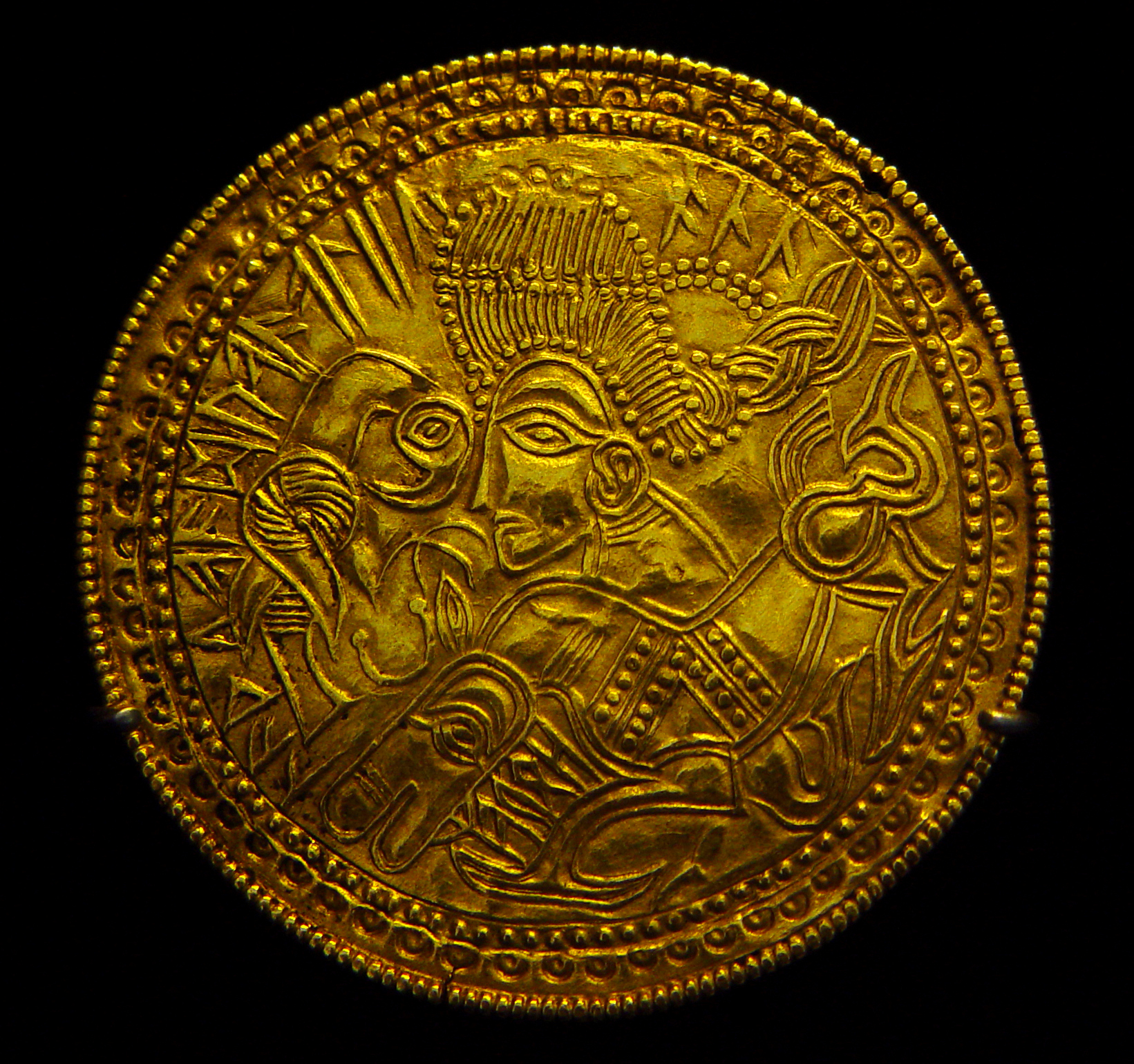
A C-type bracteate (DR BR42) featuring a figure above a horse flanked by a bird.

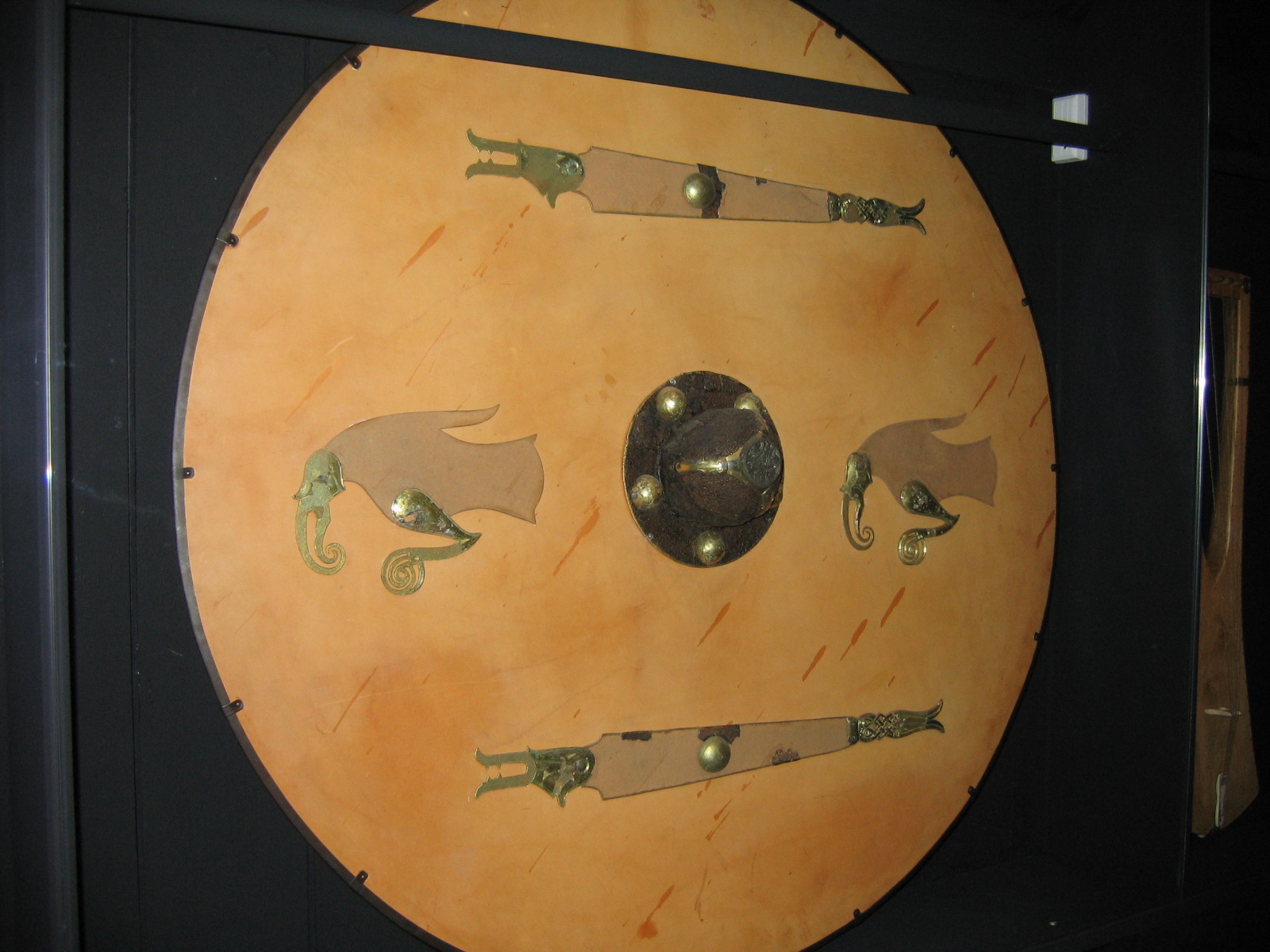
A Vendel era shield found in Vendel, Sweden, decorated with two ravens assumed to represent Huginn and Muninn.

Migration Period (5th and 6th centuries CE) gold bracteates (types A, B, and C) feature a depiction of a human figure above a horse, holding a spear and flanked by one or more often two birds. The presence of the birds has led to the iconographic identification of the human figure as the god Odin, flanked by Huginn and Muninn. Like Snorri's Prose Edda description of the ravens, a bird is sometimes depicted at the ear of the human, or at the ear of the horse.

Bracteates have been found in Denmark, Sweden, Norway and, in smaller numbers, England and areas south of Denmark. Austrian Germanist Rudolf Simek states that these bracteates may depict Odin and his ravens healing a horse, and may indicate that the birds were originally not simply his battlefield companions but also "Odin's helpers in his veterinary function."

Vendel era helmet plates, from the 6th or 7th century, found in a grave in Sweden depict a helmeted figure holding a spear and a shield while riding a horse, flanked by two birds. The plate has been interpreted as Odin accompanied by two birds: his ravens.

A pair of identical Germanic Iron Age bird-shaped brooches from Bejsebakke in northern Denmark may be depictions of Huginn and Muninn. The back of each bird features a mask motif, and the feet of the birds are shaped like the heads of animals. The feathers of the birds are also composed of animal heads. Together, the animal heads on the feathers form a mask on the back of the bird. The birds have powerful beaks and fan-shaped tails, indicating that they are ravens. The brooches were intended to be worn on each shoulder, after Germanic Iron Age fashion.

Archaeologist Peter Vang Petersen comments that while the symbolism of the brooches is open to debate, the shape of the beaks and tail-feathers confirm that the brooch depictions are ravens. Petersen notes that "raven-shaped ornaments worn as a pair, after the fashion of the day, one on each shoulder, make one's thoughts turn toward Odin's ravens and the cult of Odin in the Germanic Iron Age". Petersen says that Odin is associated with disguise and that the masks on the ravens may be portraits of Odin.

The Oseberg tapestry fragments, discovered within the Viking Age Oseberg ship burial in Norway, feature a scene containing two black birds hovering over a horse, possibly originally leading a wagon, as a part of a procession of horse-led wagons on the tapestry. In her examination of the tapestry, scholar Anne Stine Ingstad interprets these birds as Huginn and Muninn flying over a covered cart containing an image of Odin, drawing comparison with the images of Nerthus attested by Tacitus in 1 CE.

Excavations in Ribe in Denmark have recovered a Viking Age lead metal-caster's mould and 11 identical casting-moulds. These objects depict a moustached man wearing a helmet that features two head-ornaments. Archaeologist Stig Jensen proposes that these ornaments should be interpreted as Huginn and Muninn, and the wearer as Odin. He notes that "similar depictions occur everywhere the Vikings went – from eastern England to Russia and naturally also in the rest of Scandinavia."

A portion of Thorwald's Cross, a partly surviving runestone erected at Kirk Andreas on the Isle of Man, depicts a bearded human holding a spear downward at a wolf, his right foot in its mouth, and a large bird on his shoulder. Andy Orchard comments that this bird may be either Huginn or Muninn. The Scandinavian Runic-text Database dates the cross to 940, while Pluskowski dates it to the 11th century. This depiction has been interpreted as Odin, with a raven or eagle at his shoulder, being consumed by the monstrous wolf Fenrir during the events of Ragnarök.

In November 2009, the Roskilde Museum announced the discovery and subsequent display of a niello-inlaid silver figurine found in Lejre, Denmark, which they dubbed "Odin from Lejre". The silver object depicts a person sitting on a throne. The throne features the heads of animals and is flanked by two birds. The Roskilde Museum identifies the figure as Odin sitting on his throne Hliðskjálf, flanked by the ravens Huginn and Muninn.

== Interpretations ==
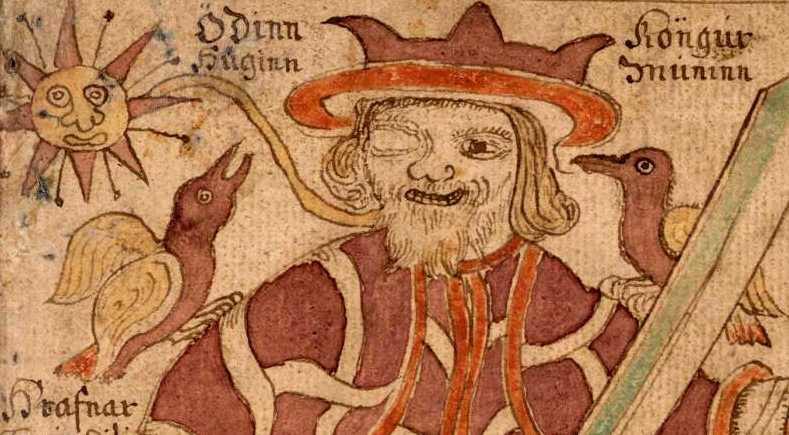
Huginn and Muninn sit on Odin's shoulders in an illustration from an 18th-century Icelandic manuscript

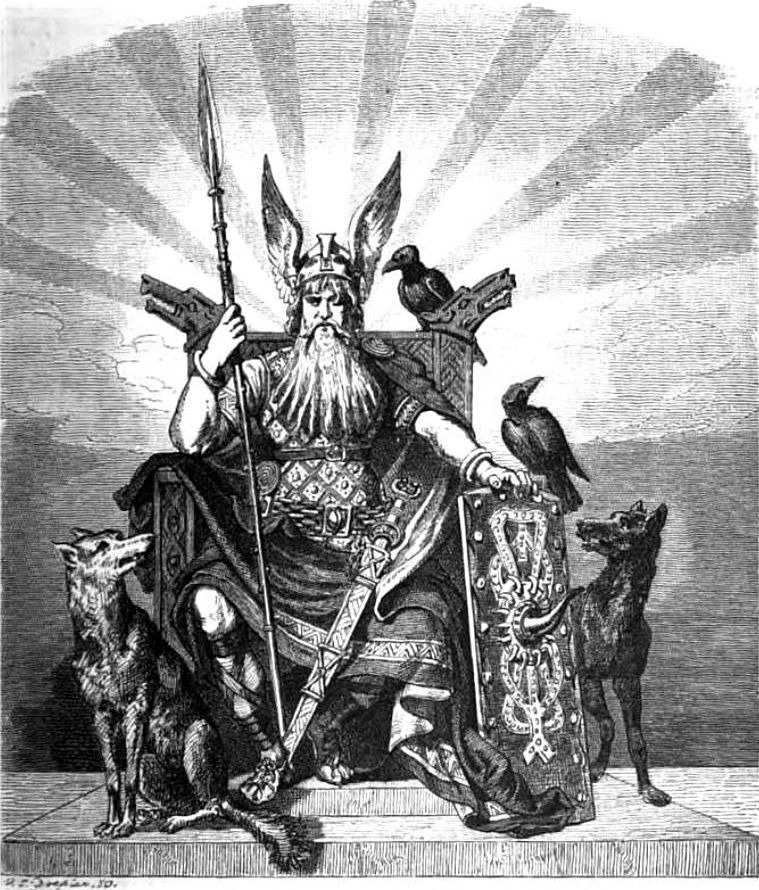
Odin enthroned and holding his spear Gungnir, flanked by his ravens Huginn and Muninn and wolves Geri and Freki (1882) by Carl Emil Doepler

Scholars have linked Odin's relation to Huginn and Muninn to shamanic practice. John Lindow relates Odin's ability to send his "thought" (Huginn) and "mind" (Muninn) to the trance-state journey of shamans. Lindow says the Grímnismál stanza where Odin worries about the return of Huginn and Muninn "would be consistent with the danger that the shaman faces on the trance-state journey."

Rudolf Simek is critical of the approach, stating that "attempts have been made to interpret Odin's ravens as a personification of the god's intellectual powers. This can only be assumed from the names Huginn and Muninn themselves, which were unlikely to have been invented much before the 9th or 10th centuries". The two ravens, as Odin's companions, appear to derive from much earlier times. Instead, Simek connects Huginn and Muninn with wider raven symbolism in the Germanic world, including the raven banner, described in English chronicles and Scandinavian sagas, a banner which was woven in a method that allowed it, when fluttering in the wind, to appear as if the raven depicted upon it was beating its wings.

Anthony Winterbourne connects Huginn and Muninn to the Norse concepts of the fylgja, a concept with three characteristics: shape-shifting abilities, good fortune, and the guardian spirit; and to the hamingja, the ghostly double of a person that may appear in the form of an animal. Winterbourne states that "The shaman's journey through the different parts of the cosmos is symbolized by the hamingja concept of the shape-shifting soul, and gains another symbolic dimension for the Norse soul in the account of Oðin's ravens, Huginn and Muninn". In response to Simek's criticism of attempts to interpret the ravens "philosophically", Winterbourne says that "such speculations [...] simply strengthen the conceptual significance made plausible by other features of the mythology" and that the names Huginn and Muninn "demand more explanation than is usually provided".

The Heliand, an Old Saxon adaptation of the New Testament from the 9th century, differs from the New Testament in that an explicit reference is made to a dove sitting on the shoulder of Christ. Regarding this, G. Ronald Murphy says "In placing the powerful white dove not just above Christ, but right on his shoulder, the Heliand author has portrayed Christ, not only as the Son of the All-Ruler, but also as a new Woden. This deliberate image of Christ triumphantly astride the land with the magnificent bird on his shoulders (the author is perhaps a bit embarrassed that the bird is an unwarlike dove!) is an image intended to calm the fears and longings of those who mourn the loss of Woden and who want to return to the old religion's symbols and ways. With this image, Christ becomes a Germanic god, one into whose ears the Spirit of the Almighty whispers".

Bernd Heinrich theorizes that Huginn and Muninn, along with Odin and his wolves Geri and Freki, reflect a symbiosis observed in the natural world among ravens, wolves, and humans on the hunt:

In a biological symbiosis one organism typically shores up some weakness or deficiency of the other(s). As in such a symbiosis, Odin the father of all humans and gods, though in human form was imperfect by himself. As a separate entity he lacked depth perception (being one-eyed) and he was apparently also uninformed and forgetful. But his weaknesses were compensated by his ravens, Hugin (mind) and Munin (memory) who were part of him. They perched on his shoulders and reconnoitered to the ends of the earth each day to return in the evening and tell him the news. He also had two wolves at his side, and the man/god-raven-wolf association was like one single organism in which the ravens were the eyes, mind, and memory, and the wolves the providers of meat and nourishment. As god, Odin was the ethereal part – he only drank wine and spoke only in poetry. I wondered if the Odin myth was a metaphor that playfully and poetically encapsulates ancient knowledge of our prehistoric past as hunters in association with two allies to produce a powerful hunting alliance. It would reflect a past that we have long forgotten and whose meaning has been obscured and badly frayed as we abandoned our hunting cultures to become herders and agriculturists, to whom ravens act as competitors.

== Other uses ==
"Huginn" and "Muninn" were the names for the missions of European Space Agency astronauts – respectively of Andreas Mogensen of Denmark, and Marcus Wandt of Sweden – aboard the International Space Station in January 2024.

== In works ==
- Hrafnsmál, a 9th-century Old Norse poem consisting of a conversation between a valkyrie and a raven

=== Modern ===
- Hugin and Munin (Marvel Comics), Marvel Comics characters based on the Norse originals
- Ace Combat 7: Skies Unknown, a video game with two final bosses of the same name as the ravens

== See also ==
- List of names of Odin, which include Hrafnaguð and Hrafnáss, both meaning 'raven god'
- Valravn, a supernatural "raven of the slain" appearing in 19th-century Danish folk songs
- Yatagarasu, the 3-legged crow familiar of the Shinto Kami, Amaterasu
