= Nábrók =

Mythical trousers in Icelandic folklore

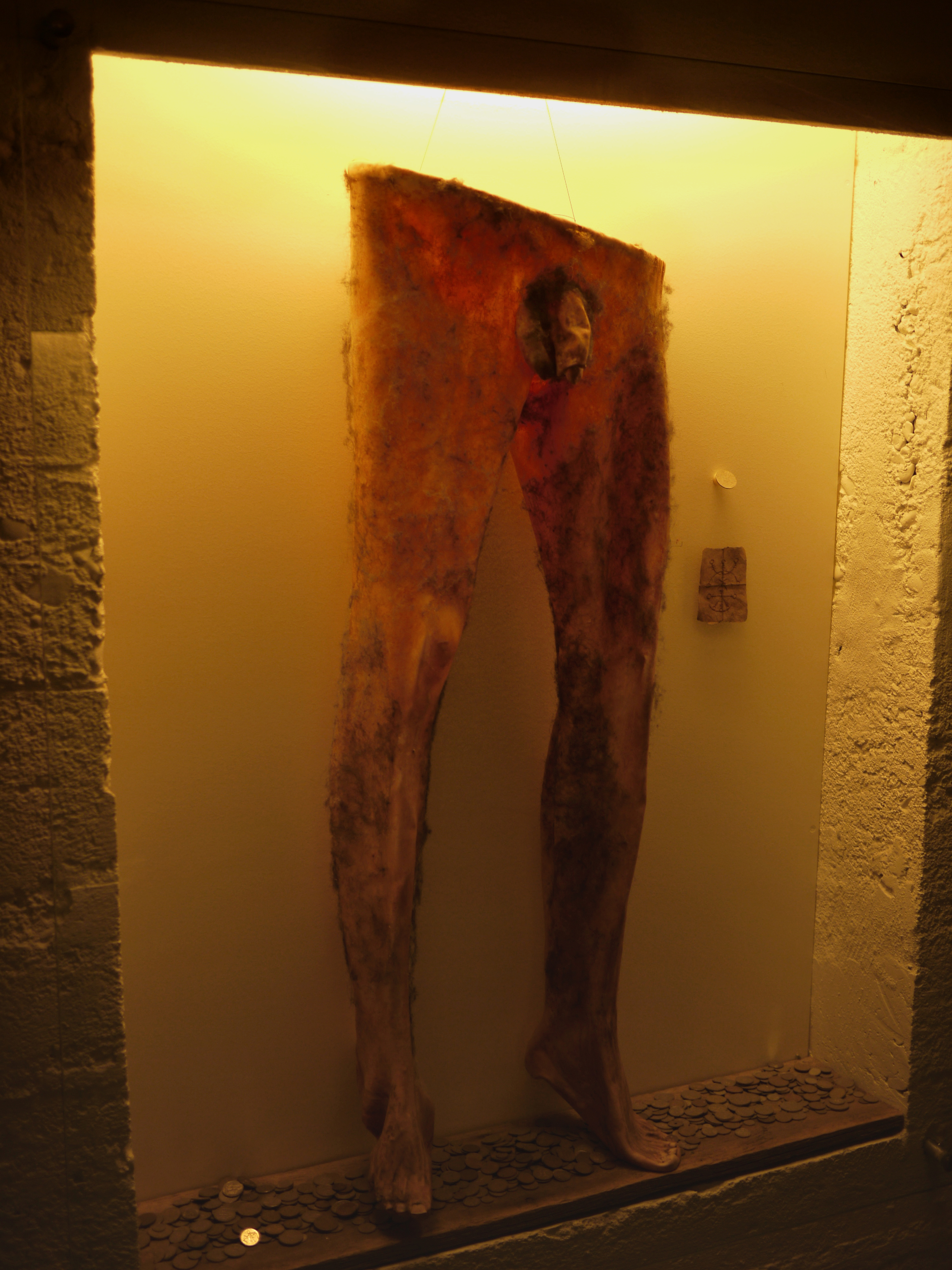
A replica of a pair of nábrók at The Museum of Icelandic Sorcery & Witchcraft. At the right is the magical symbol that is part of the ritual and at its feet are coins.

Nábrók or nábuxur (calqued as necropants, literally "corpse breeches") are a pair of pants made from the skin of a dead human, which are believed in Icelandic witchcraft to be capable of producing an endless supply of money. It is highly unlikely these pants ever existed outside of folklore.

The Strandagaldur (The Museum of Icelandic Sorcery and Witchcraft) houses a reconstructed nábrok, on exhibit (shown right) .

== Folklore ==
The folklore surrounding these magic pair of pants, called by several appellations in Iceland, were described by Jón Árnason in his folklore collection, under section on "töfrabrögð" ('magic tricks'), and translated into English by Jacqueline Simpson under "Lappish Breeches". (Note: Simpson's translation curtails the prefatory paragraph on magic and begins with the description of the breeches, hence the section name change.)

According to this superstition, anyone who desired never to run out of money (Note: This is the sense of Icelandic "Þeir, sem vildu afla sèr penínga, sem aldrei væri þrot nè endir á". Mauer uses the German stock phrase "wikt:in Hülle und Fülle meaning 'in abundance'; Powell and Magnusson embellish somewhat as: "When a man wishes to get riches, at once vast and inexhaustible, and always waxing during his lifetime, he must.. [obtain] the so-called 'Devil's pair of drawers;' also called ..". Simpson gives "money that would never fail them".) would attempt to obtain a pair of skollabrækur (pl. case, "devil's breeks", "Old Nick's breeches"; cf. "demon pants").

The same magical wealth-gathering apparel was otherwise also known as Finnabrækur ("Breeches of Fins", "Lappish Breeches" (Note: Also "Finn Breeches".)); gjaldbuxur ("Money Trousers", "Money Breeches"); nábuxur/nábrók ("Dead-man's pantaloons", "Corpse Breeches"); or Papeyarbuxur ("Papey Breeches"). (Note: It is explained further that Fins or Lapps are reputed to be wizards, and Papey is an isle reputed to be populated by the wealthy.)

The term "necropants" is a designation under which the object has come to be popularly known.

=== Ritual ===
The nábrók is obtained by first making a (mutual) pact with a friend that if either of them die, the other can use his corpse to make a pair of "Corpse Breeches" with. Once one of them dies, the survivor digs up the body, and flays the skin from the waist down so as not to puncture any holes. The freshly skinned pants must be worn right away, and it is said to grow on the person, until such times as he appoints to remove the pair in order to give to someone else (cf. § Removal below). There is no wealth-giving magic on it yet, and in order to activate the charm, the person must steal a coin from a wretchedly poor widow, which theft must be performed between the readings of the Epistle and Gospel during one of the three major festivals of the year (or "between the First and Second Lesson on.. Yule, Easter, or Whitsuntide"), then deposit the coin into the pungur (translated politely as "pockets" but actually denoting "scrotum") of the "Corpse Breeches". Some say the wearer can also choose the time of theft to be carried out on the very next day after the pants are first worn. Afterwards the breeches will start collecting coins from the living, which the wearer is free to dispense with. However, he must be careful not to remove the original coin if he wishes to keep the magic effect intact.

=== Later elaboration ===
Alleged Nábrókarstafur (Stave for Necropants) It is otherwise given as the Gimhringur stave (recté Ginningarhringur stave).

According to recent literature, a piece of paper inscribed with a magical symbol (magical Icelandic stave) must be placed with the coin in the scrotum sack; this particular symbol being given the name "Nábrókarstafur". (Note: "Stave for Necropants" (The Museum of Icelandic Sorcery and Witchcraft) accessed 2012, quoted in Lund (2015) and Barraclough (2016). Similar description in Icelandic is retained on the description page for different staves.)

The stave is mentioned in Halldór Laxness's historic novel, Íslandsklukkan ("Iceland's Bell" 1943) where a character named Jón Þeófilusson is caught possessing the sign of the vindgapi (translated as "Blusterer") and the nábrókarstafur (sign of the "Corpse's Breeches"), thereby facing the prospect of being burned as a sorcerer.

The in-depth analysis of the novel by Eiríkur Jónsson (1981) uncovered that in a manuscript of a Galdrabók, the above-depicted sign, labeled as "Gim-Ring[??] or Corpse Breeches stave" (Gimhringur eða Nábrókarstafur). But other manuscripts do not associate this symbol with the Corpse Breeches, and label the symbol as Ginnhringur or Ginningarhringur whose name then can be made meaningful sense as "Ring of Allurement". This may in turn be related to the Ginnir ("enticer") stave used to charm a love interest. (Note: The Ginnir pictogram is shown in illustration by Jón Árnason, but he professes not to know its purpose. Powell and Magnússon however explains Ginnir (or Ginner) as a love charm.)

=== Removal ===
The diabolical (Icelandic: djöfullegt) nature of the object has been emphasized by commentators. According to some, the pants were the gift of the devil to those who have sold his soul to them. (Note: "Some say that they are from the devil himself, and given by him only to those who have sold him their souls".)

These pairs cannot be removed by its wearer until he is at his life's end, but it will become imperative for him to remove his pair and pass it onto another, otherwise, the "salvation of his soul" is at stake, and his corpse will be smothered by vermin. And the particular sequence must be followed. The wearer cannot simply remove and hand over the pants, but must do it one leg at a time. That is to say, he must first "doff" the pants off his right leg, and make his successor wear the right pant leg. At that point, his successor is committed to his fate; even if he tries to change his mind and take off the right pant leg, he will wind up wearing the left leg, regardless of his will.

== Related folklore ==
Jón "ríki" Þórðarson ("the Rich", b. 1771) is associated with a ghost story (fylgja tale) of Móhúsa-Skotta (Skotta of Peathouse"), also recorded by Jón Árnason Margaret Willson writes that a rumour of owning "demon's pants" to accumulate wealth was attached to this figure.

There is also the folktale about a witch named Katla, associated with the volcano Katla, also recorded by Jón Árnason. Mathias Nordvig comments that Katla owns magical breeches that lets her travel long distance quickly, like the Seven-league boots of fairy tale, and it may somehow be connected to the nábrók as well.

== See also ==
- Galdrabók
