= Vegvísir =

Icelandic magical stave intended as a wayfinder

A digital representation of the vegvísir, based on the Huld manuscript

The vegvísir (Icelandic for "wayfinder", lit. 'way shower') is an Icelandic magical stave intended to help the bearer find their way through rough weather. The earliest known attestation is in the 1860 Huld manuscript.

Despite its lack of a clear connection to the Viking Age, the symbol is often erroneously called a Viking compass.

== Etymology ==
Vegvísir is a compound word formed from the two Icelandic words: vegur (lit. 'way') and vísir (lit. 'show + -er'). Vegur means 'way, road, path', and vísir is an inflected form of vísa, 'to show, to let know, to guide, point out, indicate'. Its meaning is comparable to English wise, as in, 'it points someone the right way'.

The construction also exists in other Germanic languages: Danish: vejviser, Swedish: vägvisare, German: Wegweiser, variously meaning "signpost, directionary", etc. The word can be traced back to the 15th century (Old Danish: veivisere; Old Swedish: væghvisare) in its literal and figurative sense.

== Huld manuscript ==
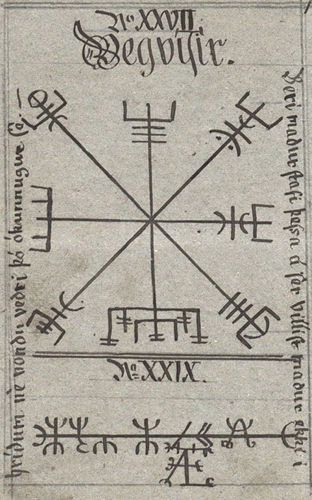
The vegvísir as depicted on page 60 of the Huld manuscript

The vegvísir first shows up in the 1860 Huld manuscript (ÍB 383 4to), today part of the National Library in Reykjavík. The manuscript is a collection of occult symbols and therof, collected in Iceland by Geir Vigfusson in Akureyri in 1860. A leaf of the manuscript (page 60) provides an image of the symbol, gives its name, and, in prose, declares that "if this sign is carried, one will never lose one's way in storms or bad weather, even when the way is not known".

Stephen E. Flowers lists the Vegvisir in his translation of the grimoire Galdrabók, but in a later publication cites it in “Isländische Zauberzeichen und Zauberbücher” by Ólafur Davíðsson rather than the Galdrabók. (Note: Flowers lists the image on page 88 of Icelandic Magic: Practical Secrets of the Northern Grimoires, Inner Traditions, 2016 giving the source, page 125, as “Isländische Zauberzeichen und Zauberbücher.” Zeitschrift des Vereins für Volkskunde 13 (1903): 150–67, 267–79; Tables III–VII. English version: Icelandic Magic Symbols and Spell Books. Translated and annotated by Justin Foster. www.academia.edu (accessed July 17, 2015).) Tomáš Vlasatý claims that it is not only in the Huld manuscript but also in two other Icelandic grimoires, Galdrakver (designated Lbs 2917 a 4to and Lbs 4627 8vo) and has Christian roots.

== Popular culture ==
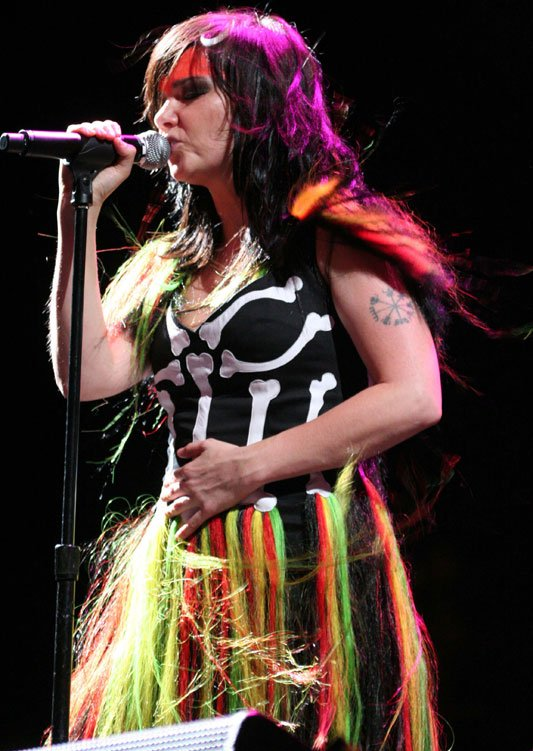
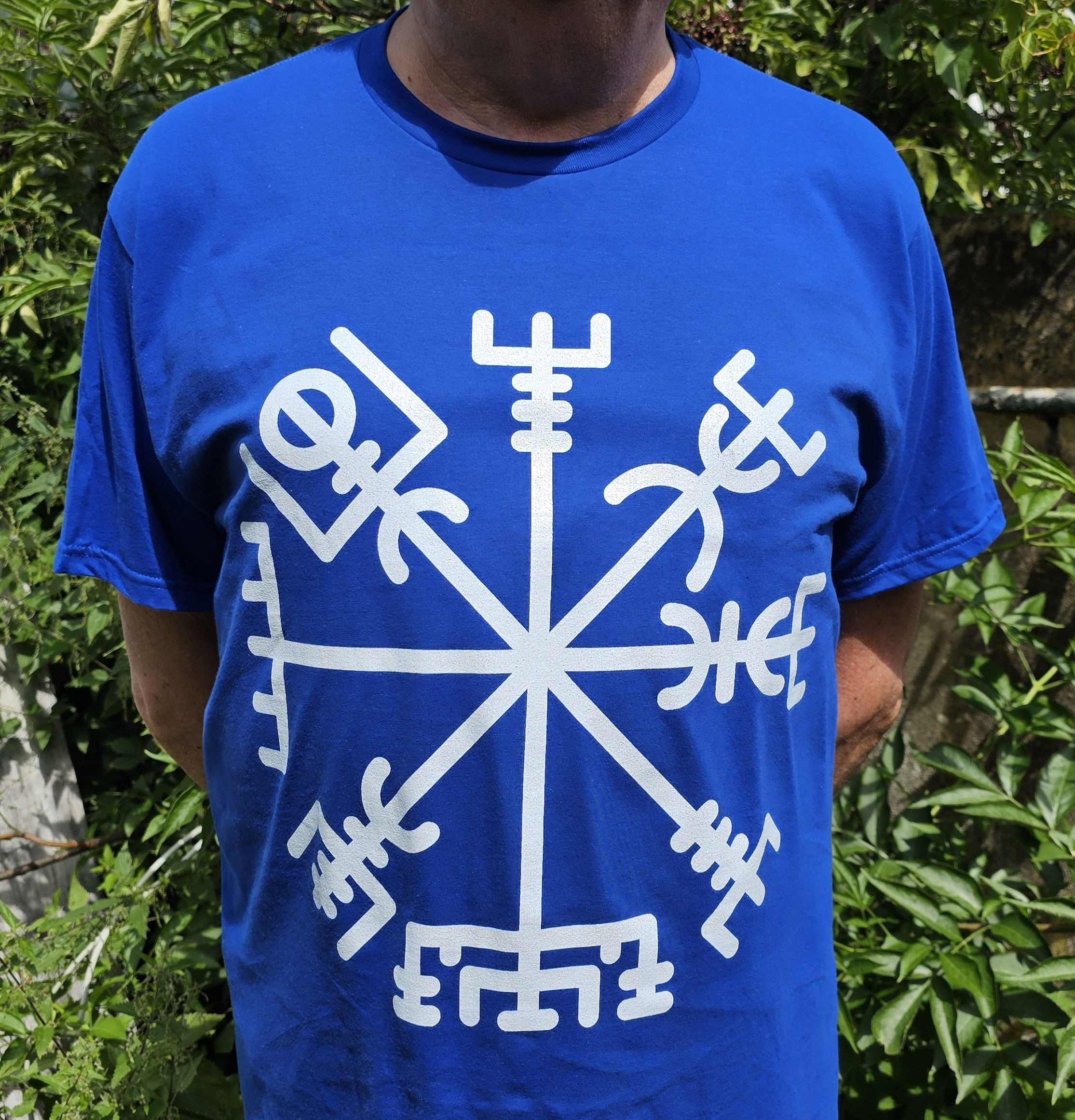
- Left, Icelandic singer Björk with a vegvísir tattoo; right, modern use on a T-shirt

== See also ==
- Ægishjálmur (occult symbol)

== Bibliography ==
- Flowers, Stephen (1989). The Galdrabók: An Icelandic Grimoire. Samuel Weiser, Inc. ISBN 087728685X
- Justin Foster Huld Manuscript of Galdrastafir Witchcraft Magic Symbols and Runes - English Translation (2015)
- Geirsson, Olgair (2004). Galdrakver: A Book of Magic. Landsbokasafn Islands Haskolabokasafn ISBN 9979800402
- Skuggi J Eggertsson Galdraskraeda The Sorcerer's Screed ISBN 9935908984
