= Hug (folklore) =

Individual's mental life in Scandinavian mythology

Hug (Old Norse: hugr, Danish: hug, Faroese: hugur, Icelandic: hugur, Norwegian: hug, Swedish: håg, hug) is an old Nordic (originally Germanic) word for the mind, encompassing spirit, will, prudence, thought, understanding, reason, and more, especially the soul understood as the seat of thoughts, feelings and will etc. Today, it is the common Icelandic word for 'mind', and still regular in various Swedish phrases and compounds.

Hug has a significant role in Norse mythology and folklore, among other things, related to shapeshifting. Odin's two domesticated ravens, Huginn and Muninn ("The Hug and The Mun"), are named after the overlapping concepts of hug and mun respectively (roughly "mind" and "sense" perhaps).

== Etymology ==
The Old Norse form hugr (compare Old Swedish: hugher, hogher) stems from a Proto-Germanic root, with cognates in various Germanic languages: Gothic: 𐌷𐌿𐌲𐍃, romanized: hugs, Old Saxon: hugi, Middle Dutch: hoghe, Dutch: heug, Old English: hyge, Old High German: hugu, hugi, all with similar meaning, partially also "peace, joy", etc.

A byform also exists as hugi (Icelandic: hugi, Old Swedish: hughi, hoghi, oblique case: hugha, hogha, modern Swedish: -huga), meaning "state of mind". In Swedish, compounds like farhåga (lit. 'danger-håga'), räddhåga (lit. 'fear-håga'), mean "fear, concern" and thereof.

== Senses ==
Rather philosophical in description, hug, encompasses that in man that thinks, feels and wants; if the soul is understood as the seat of ideas, thoughts and memories, will and emotions. It can be specific emotions, moods, desires, wishes and the like. Compare the Swedish expressions sorgsen håg (lit. 'sad mind'), sorgsen i hågen (lit. 'sad in the mind'). It can also refer to things that move through someone's mind of thoughts and emotions, such as wishes, hopes, fears, doubts and so on.

In particular, in its original meaning, it referred to understanding, reason, thinking and thought. Such occurs, among other things, in the Swedish compound förhåg (lit. 'forethought', "assumption, hope"), i förhåg (lit. 'in forethought', "in advance, in assumption, in hope"). It is sometimes used in a transitive sense of memory, such as in the Swedish common expression komma ihåg (lit. 'come into mind', "to remember"), but also expressions such as gå ur hågen (lit. 'go out of the mind', "to be forgotten, to fall into oblivion, to be erased from someone's memory").

It has also been used about personality and similar senses: disposition, mood, aptitude, inner essence, characterization, psyche, mindset, nature, temperament, spirit (animating force), also personality traits and qualities, etc. Furthermore, it has been used for tendency, desire, interest, also affection; likewise about self-esteem and bravery. In Swedish, one could say that someone has glatt håg ("a happy mind") or sitter högt på hågen ("is sitting high on the mind").

== In Norse mythology ==
In Norse mythology, the hug is an individual's mental life, in some contrast to the soul, a term which carries more spiritual connotations. The hug is no simple concept and shows great variation, with different accounts and characteristics given in the literature from medieval literature to more recent folklore. It is central to the conception of magic, and can influence animate and inanimate objects.

It is said that it, in a dream-like state, could leave the body and pass into a hamr, a manifested shape (a sort of shapeshifting). It can manifest itself externally in a variety of possible forms; that of witches, for instance, sometimes took the shape of a cat.

In the story where Thor meets the giant Útgarða-Loki, they let their two servants compete against each other in speed. Thor's servant was called Þjálfi and Útgarða-Loki's was called "Hugi". When the start went off, Hugi stood still, but when Þjálfi was about to cross the finish line, Hugi suddenly rushed past, fast as lightning. Hugi was said to be the giant's thought (hug) and no one can run faster than thought.

== See also ==
- Itse (Finnish paganism)
- Troll cat
