= Geri and Freki =

Two wolves in Norse mythology

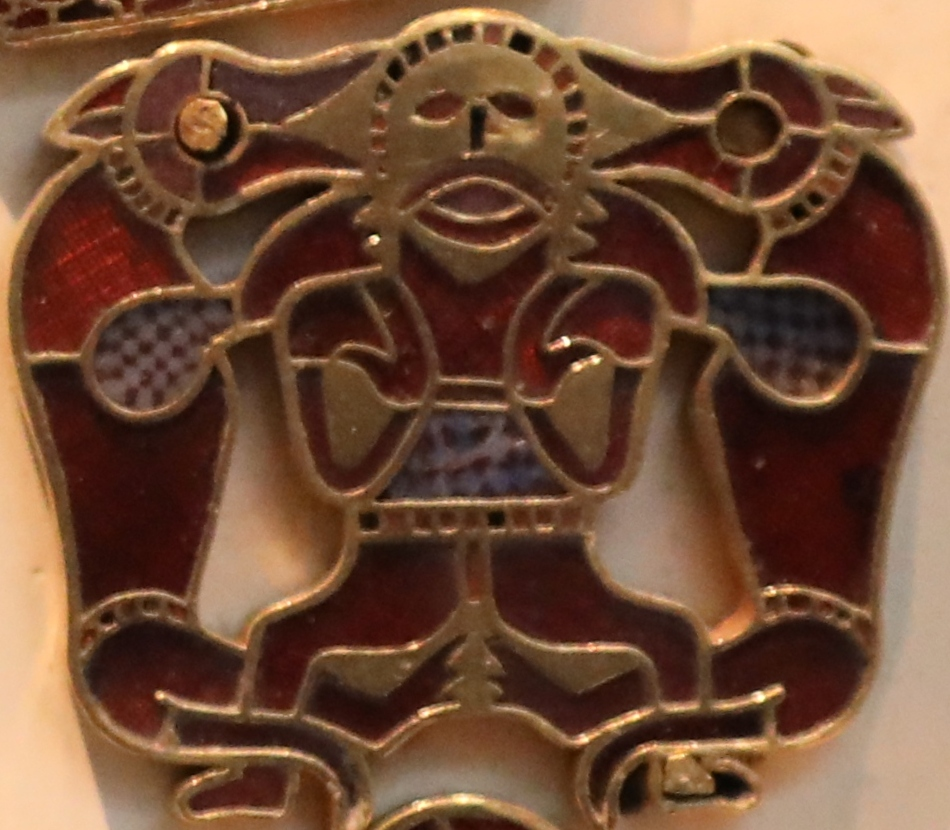
A decoration on the Sutton Hoo purse-lid, showing a one-eyed figure (hard to see in photo) between two wolves, thought to depict Odin with Geri and Freki.

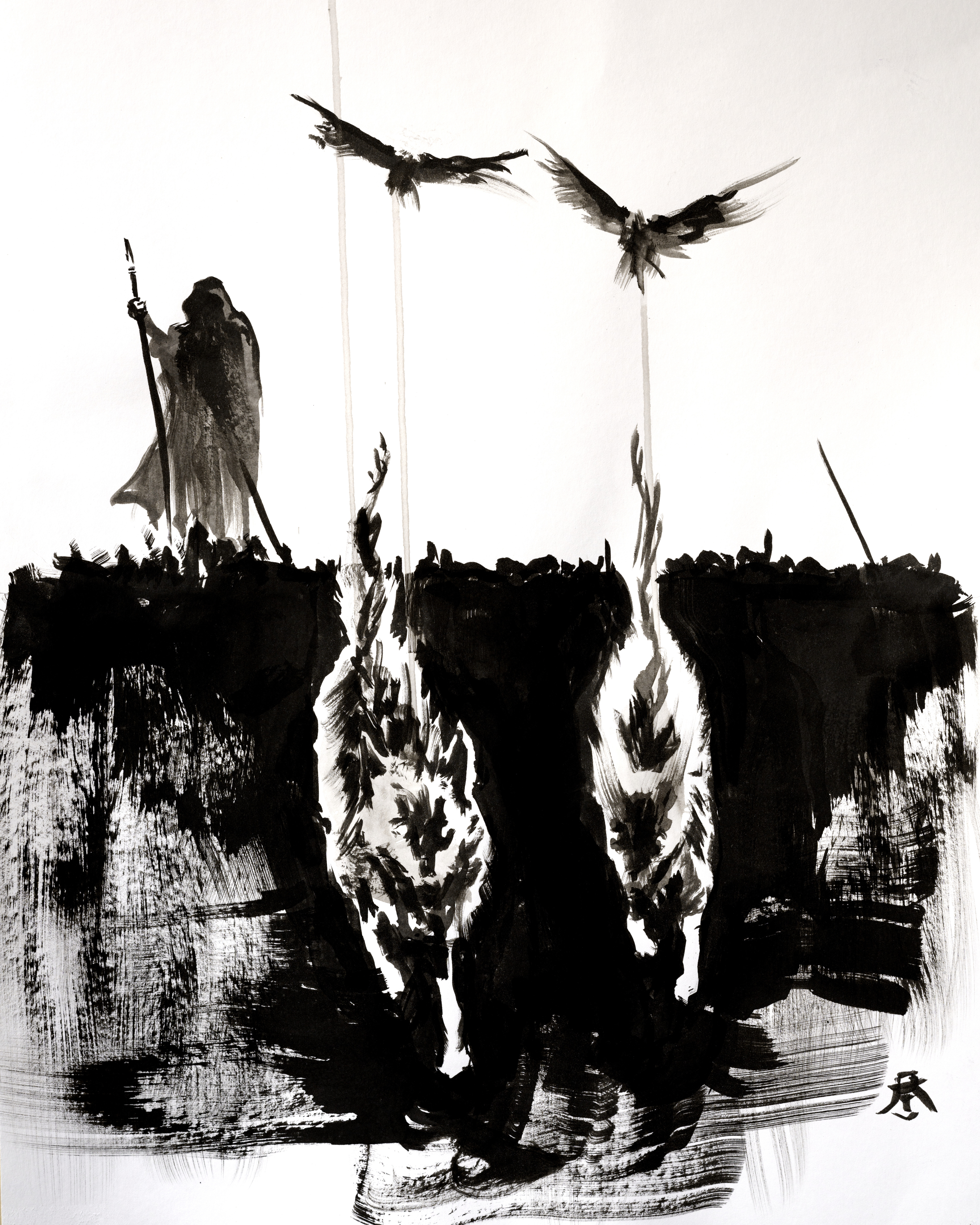
A modern ambiguous ink painting of Odin with his two ravens Huginn and Muninn, as well as his two wolves Geri and Freki.

In Norse mythology, Geri and Freki (roughly "Greed" and "Glutton") are two wolves which are said to accompany the god Odin. They are attested in the Poetic Edda, a collection of epic poetry compiled in the 13th century from earlier traditional sources, in the Prose Edda, written in the 13th century by Snorri Sturluson, and in the poetry of skalds.

The pair has been compared to similar figures found in Greek, Roman and Vedic mythology, and may also be connected to beliefs surrounding the Germanic "wolf-warrior bands", the Úlfhéðnar.

== Etymology ==
The name Geri has been interpreted as meaning either "the greedy one" or "the ravenous one". The name Geri stems from the root morpheme ger/gir, traced back to a Proto-Germanic adjective: *geraz, attested in Burgundian girs, Old Norse gerr, Old Swedish giri ("greed, desire"), Old High German ger or giri and Old Dutch gir, all of which mean "greedy". Compare modern Danish: gerrig, girig, Norwegian: girug, Swedish: girig, all meaning greedy.

The name Freki can be traced back to the Proto-Germanic adjective *frekaz, attested in Gothic 𐍆𐌰𐌹𐌷𐌿𐍆𐍂𐌹𐌺𐍃 (faihufriks) "covetous, avaricious", Old English frec "desirous, greedy, gluttonous, audacious" and Old High German freh "greedy, covetous, desirous", The Old Norse form frekr is fairly broad (compare modern Danish: fræk, Norwegian: frek, Swedish: fräck, fräk), meaning "brazen, enterprising, covetous, greedy and insatiable", including having a voracious appetite (”gluttonous”).

John Lindow interprets both Old Norse names as nominalized adjectives. Bruce Lincoln further traces Geri back to a Proto-Indo-European stem *gher-, which is the same as that found in Garmr, a name referring to the hound closely associated with the events of Ragnarök.

== Attestations ==
In the Poetic Edda poem Grímnismál, the god Odin (disguised as Grímnir) provides the young Agnarr with information about Odin's companions. Agnarr is told that Odin feeds Geri and Freki while the god himself consumes only wine:

Benjamin Thorpe translation: Geri and Freki the war-wont sates, the triumphant sire of hosts; but on wine only the famed in arms, Odin, ever lives.	Henry Adams Bellows translation: Freki and Geri does Heerfather feed, The far-famed fighter of old: But on wine alone does the weapon-decked god, Othin, forever live.

The pair is also alluded to via the kenning "Viðrir's (Odin's) hounds" in Helgakviða Hundingsbana I, verse 13, where it is related that they roam the field "greedy for the corpses of those who have fallen in battle".

Benjamin Thorpe translation: The warriors went to the trysting place of swords, which they had appointed at Logafiöll. Broken was Frodi's peace between the foes: Vidrir’s hounds went about the isle slaughter-greedy.	Henry Adams Bellows translation: The warriors forth to the battle went, The field they chose at Logafjoll; Frothi's peace midst foes they broke, Through the isle went hungrily Vithrir's hounds.

In the Prose Edda book Gylfaginning (chapter 38), the enthroned figure of High explains that Odin gives all of the food on his table to his wolves Geri and Freki and that Odin requires no food, for wine is to him both meat and drink. High then quotes the above-mentioned stanza from the poem Grímnismál in support. In chapter 75 of the Prose Edda book Skáldskaparmál a list of names for wargs and wolves is provided that includes both Geri and Freki.

In skaldic poetry Geri and Freki are used as common nouns for "wolf" in chapter 58 of Skáldskaparmál (quoted in works by the skalds Þjóðólfr of Hvinir and Egill Skallagrímsson) and Geri is again used as a common noun for "wolf" in chapter 64 of the Prose Edda book Háttatal. Geri is referenced in kennings for "blood" in chapter 58 of Skáldskaparmál ("Geri's ales" in a work by the skald Þórðr Kolbeinsson) and in for "carrion" in chapter 60 ("Geri's morsel" in a work by the skald Einarr Skúlason). Freki is also used in a kenning for "carrion" ("Freki's meal") in a work by Þórðr Sjáreksson in chapter 58 of Skáldskaparmál.

== Archaeological record ==
If the rider on horseback on the image on the Böksta Runestone has been correctly identified as Odin, then Geri and Freki are shown taking part in hunting an elk.

== Theories ==
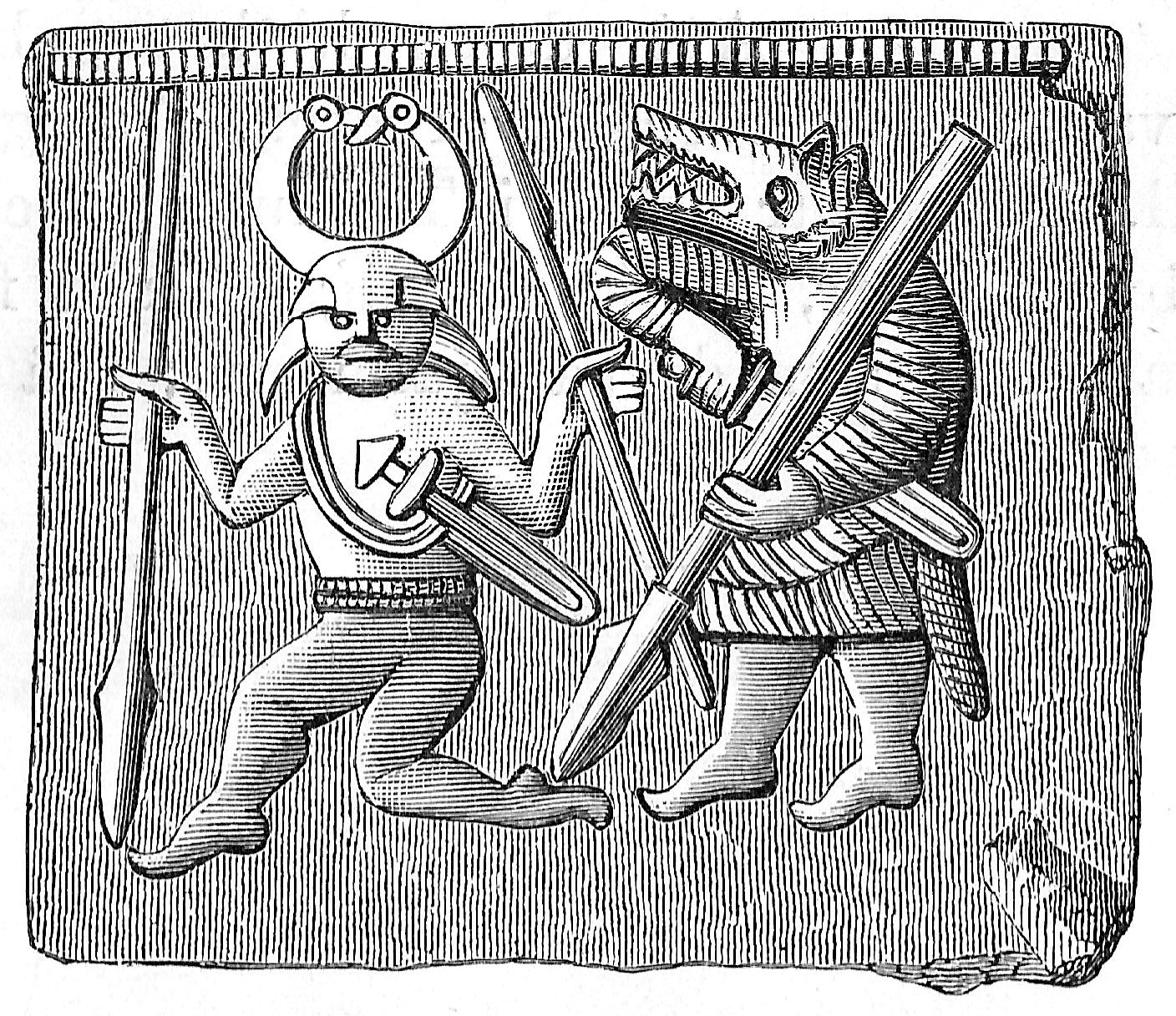
A Vendel era bronze plate found on Öland, Sweden depicting a wolf-pelt warrior drawing a sword beside a dancing figure.

Freki is also a name applied to the monstrous wolf Fenrir in the Poetic Edda poem Völuspá. Folklorist John Lindow sees irony in the fact that Odin feeds one Freki at his dinner table and another—Fenrir—with his flesh during the events of Ragnarök.

Historian Michael Spiedel connects Geri and Freki with archaeological finds depicting figures wearing wolf-pelts and frequently found wolf-related names among the Germanic peoples, including Wulfhroc ("Wolf-Frock"), Wolfhetan ("Wolf-Hide"), Isangrim ("Grey-Mask"), Scrutolf ("Garb-Wolf"), Wolfram ("Wolf (and) Raven"), Wolfgang ("Wolf-Gait"), Wolfdregil ("Wolf-Runner"), and Vulfolaic ("Wolf-Dancer") and myths regarding wolf warriors from Norse mythology (such as the Úlfhéðnar). Michael Speidel believes this to point to the pan-Germanic wolf-warrior band cult centered on Odin that waned away after Christianization.

Scholars have also noted Indo-European parallels to the wolves Geri and Freki as companions of a divinity. 19th century scholar Jacob Grimm observed a connection between this aspect of Odin's character and the Greek Apollo, to whom both the wolf and the raven are sacred. Philologist Maurice Bloomfield further connected the pair with the two dogs of Yama in Vedic mythology, and saw them as a Germanic counterpart to a more general and widespread Indo-European "Cerberus"-theme.

Speidel finds similar parallels in the Vedic Rudra and the Roman Mars. Elaborating on the connection between wolves and figures of great power, he writes: "This is why Geri and Freki, the wolves at Woden's side, also glowered on the throne of the Anglo-Saxon kings. Wolf-warriors, like Geri and Freki, were not mere animals but mythical beings: as Woden's followers they bodied forth his might, and so did wolf-warriors."

Bernd Heinrich theorizes that Geri and Freki, along with Odin and his ravens Huginn and Muninn, reflect a symbiosis observed in the natural world among ravens, wolves, and humans on the hunt:

In a biological symbiosis one organism typically shores up some weakness or deficiency of the other(s). As in such a symbiosis, Odin the father of all humans and gods, though in human form was imperfect by himself. As a separate entity he lacked depth perception (being one-eyed) and he was apparently also uninformed and forgetful. But his weaknesses were compensated by his ravens, Hugin (mind) and Munin (memory) who were part of him. They perched on his shoulders and reconnoitered to the ends of the earth each day to return in the evening and tell him the news. He also had two wolves at his side, and the man/god-raven-wolf association was like one single organism in which the ravens were the eyes, mind, and memory, and the wolves the providers of meat and nourishment. As god, Odin was the ethereal part—he only drank wine and spoke only in poetry. I wondered if the Odin myth was a metaphor that playfully and poetically encapsulates ancient knowledge of our prehistoric past as hunters in association with two allies to produce a powerful hunting alliance. It would reflect a past that we have long forgotten and whose meaning has been obscured and badly frayed as we abandoned our hunting cultures to become herders and agriculturists, to whom ravens act as competitors.

== See also ==
- List of wolves
- Fenrir
