= Manx runestones =

Stone with a runic inscription

A map of the Norse kingdom that included the Isle of Man, at the end of the 11th century

The Manx runestones were made by the Norse population on the Isle of Man during the Viking Age, mostly in the 10th century. The Isle of Man (with an area of 572 square kilometres (221 sq mi)) had 26 surviving Viking Age runestones in 1983, compared to 33 in all of Norway. The relatively high number of them may appear on the Isle of Man because of the merging of the immigrant Norse runestone tradition with the local Celtic tradition of raising high crosses.

In addition, the church contributed by not condemning the runes as pagan, but instead it encouraged the recording of people for Christian purposes. Sixteen of the stones bear the common formula, "N ... put up this cross in memory of M", but among the other ten there is also a stone raised for the benefit of the runestone raiser.

The Manx runestones are consequently similar to the Scandinavian ones, but whereas a Norwegian runestone is called "stone" in the inscriptions, even if it is in the shape of a cross, the runestones that were raised in the British isles are typically called "crosses". There are also two slabs incised with Anglo-Saxon runes at Maughold.

== Andreas parish ==
=== Br Olsen;183 (Andreas (I), MM 99) ===
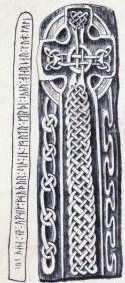
Br Olsen;183

This runestone is a stone cross that is located in the church Andreas. The inscription is in short-twig runes and it commemorates a father.

... (þ)[an](a) : [aft] (u)(f)(a)ik : fauþur : sin : in : kautr : kar[þ]i : sunr : biarnar f(r)(a) : (k)(u)(l)(i) [:]
... þenna {} ept Ófeig, {} fǫður {} sinn, {} en {} Gautr {} gerði, {} sonr {} Bjarnar frá {} Kolli. {}
"... this [cross] in memory of Ófeigr, his father, but Gautr made (it), the son of Bjǫrn from Kollr."

=== Br Olsen;184 (Andreas (II), MM 131) ===
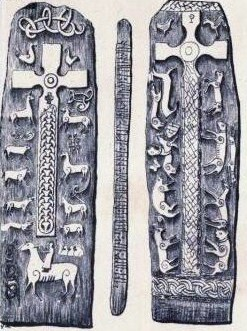
Br Olsen;184

This stone cross is located in the church Andreas. It is engraved with short-twig runes, and it is dated to c. 940. It was erected in memory of a wife.

sont:ulf : hin : suarti : raisti : krus : þona : aftir : arin:biaurk * kuinu : sina (u) [*] k : au [*]: (o)ks/(b)ks
Sandulfr {} hinn {} Svarti {} reisti {} kross {} þenna {} eptir {} Arinbjǫrgu, {} konu {} sína. ... {} ... {} ... {} ...
"Sandulfr the Black erected this cross in memory of Arinbjǫrg his wife. ..."

=== Thorwald's Cross: Br Olsen;185A (Andreas (III), MM 128) ===
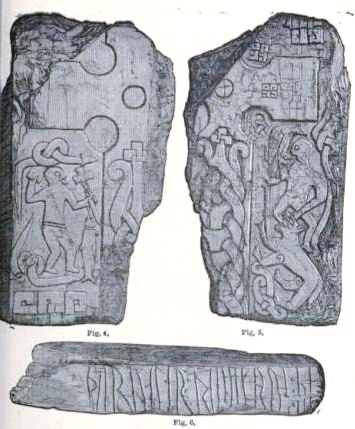
Br Olsen;185A

Referred to as Thorwald's Cross, this stone cross is found in the church Andreas. Only attribution to the one who raised the stone—Þorvaldr—remains of the message inscribed on the cross. It has been badly damaged since it was recorded. The stone depicts a bearded human holding a spear downward at a wolf, his right foot in its mouth, while a large bird sits at his shoulder. Rundata dates it to 940, while Pluskowski dates it to the 11th century.

This depiction has been interpreted as the Norse pagan god Odin, with a raven or eagle at his shoulder, being consumed by the wolf Fenrir during the events of Ragnarök. Next to the image is a depiction of a large cross and another image parallel to it that has been described as Christ triumphing over Satan. These combined elements have led to the cross as being described as "syncretic art"; a mixture of pagan and Christian beliefs. Andy Orchard comments that the bird on Odin's shoulder may be either Huginn or Muninn, Odin's ravens.

þurualtr ÷ (r)[aisti] (k)(r)(u)(s) ÷ (þ)[...]
Þorvaldr {} reisti kross {} þe[nna].
"Þorvaldr raised (this) cross."

=== Br Olsen;185B (Andreas (IV), MM 113) ===
This stone cross is located in the church Andreas. It is engraved with short-twig runes and it is dated to the 10th century. What remains of the message informs that it was raised in memory of someone.

[... ...ai]s[t]i : [k]rus : þaina : aftiʀ ...
... reisti {} kross {} þenna {} eptir ...
"... raised this cross in memory of ..."

=== Br Olsen;185C (Andreas (V), MM 111) ===
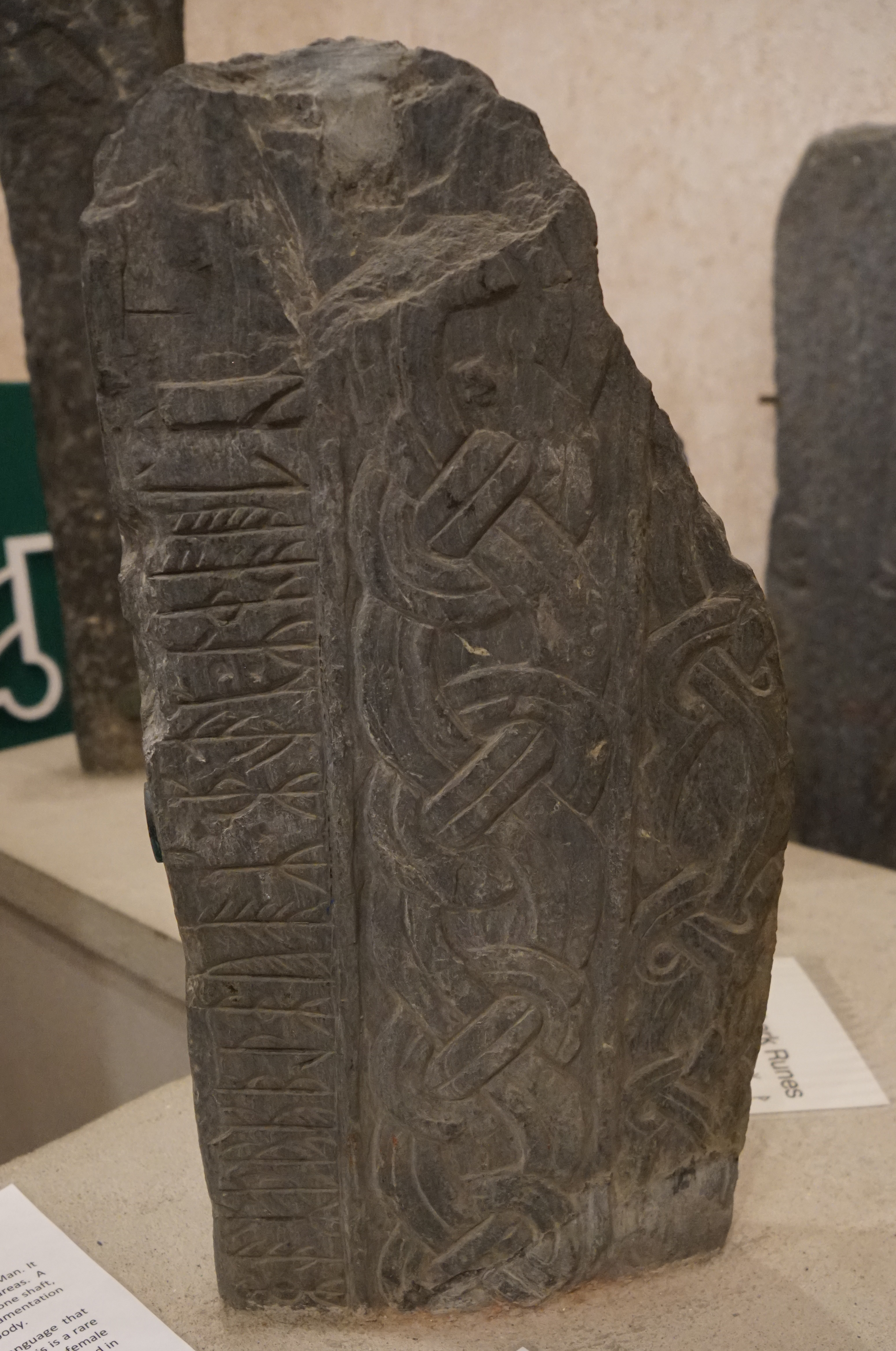
Br Olsen;185C

Only fragments remain of this stone cross, and they are located in the church Andreas. The inscription has not been deciphered, but it is of note as it consists of unusual twig runes and bind runes.

=== Br Page1998;9 (Andreas (VI), MM 121) ===
Only a fragment remains of this slab of stone that was once part of a grave. It is dated to the Viking Age and it is located in the church Andreas. Too little remains of the inscription to allow any decipherment.

ka-
...
"..."

=== Br NOR1992;6B (Andreas (VII), MM 193) ===
This fragment was discovered at Larivane Cottage it is a slab of stone was once part of a grave. The inscription was made in relief form, and it is located in the Manx Museum. What remains of the inscription cannot be read.

== Ballaugh parish ==
=== Br Olsen;189 (Ballaugh, MM 106) ===
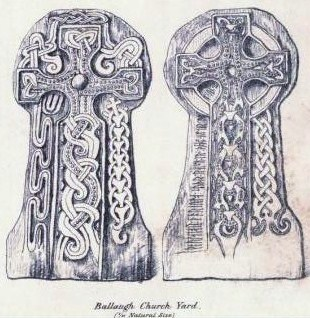
Br Olsen;189, Ballaug

This stone cross is located in Ballaugh. The inscription consists of short-twig runes and they are dated to the second half of the 10th century. It was raised in memory of a son.

oulaibr ÷ liu(t)ulbs| |sunr : r[ai](s)[ti k]rs * þ-na : ai(f)(t)ir * ...-b : sun [s]in
Áleifr/Óleifr {} Ljótulfs sonr {} reisti kross {} þ[e]nna {} eptir {} [Ul]f, {} son sinn.
"Áleifr/Óleifr, Ljótulfrs son raised this cross in memory of Ulfr, his son."

== Lezayre parish ==
=== Br Olsen;190A (Balleigh) ===
These fragments of a stone cross are found at Balleigh, and they are dated to the Viking Age. Only traces of runes remain and they cannot be read.

== Braddan parish ==
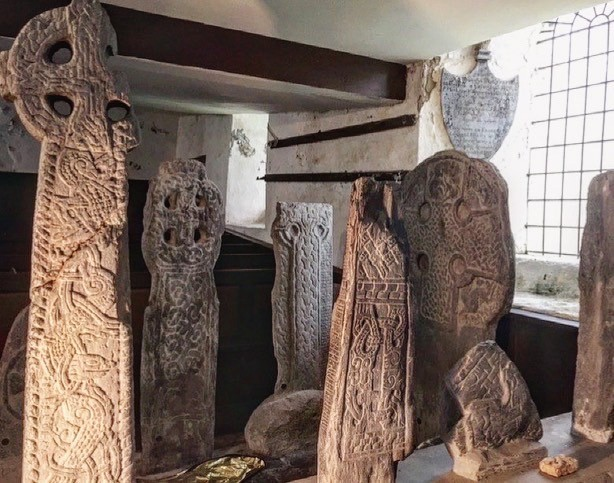
Collection of rune stones in Bradden Old Church

=== Br Olsen;190B (Braddan (I), MM 112) ===
This stone cross is located in the church Braddan. The inscription consists of short-twig runes and they are dated to 930–950. It was raised in memory of a man.

(þ)(u)(r)... : raisti : krus : þono : ift : ufaak : sun : krinais
Þorsteinn {} reisti {} kross {} þenna {} ept {} Ófeig, {} son {} Krínáns.
"Þorsteinn raised this cross in memory of Ófeigr, the son of Krínán."

=== Br Olsen;191A (Braddan (II), MM 138) ===
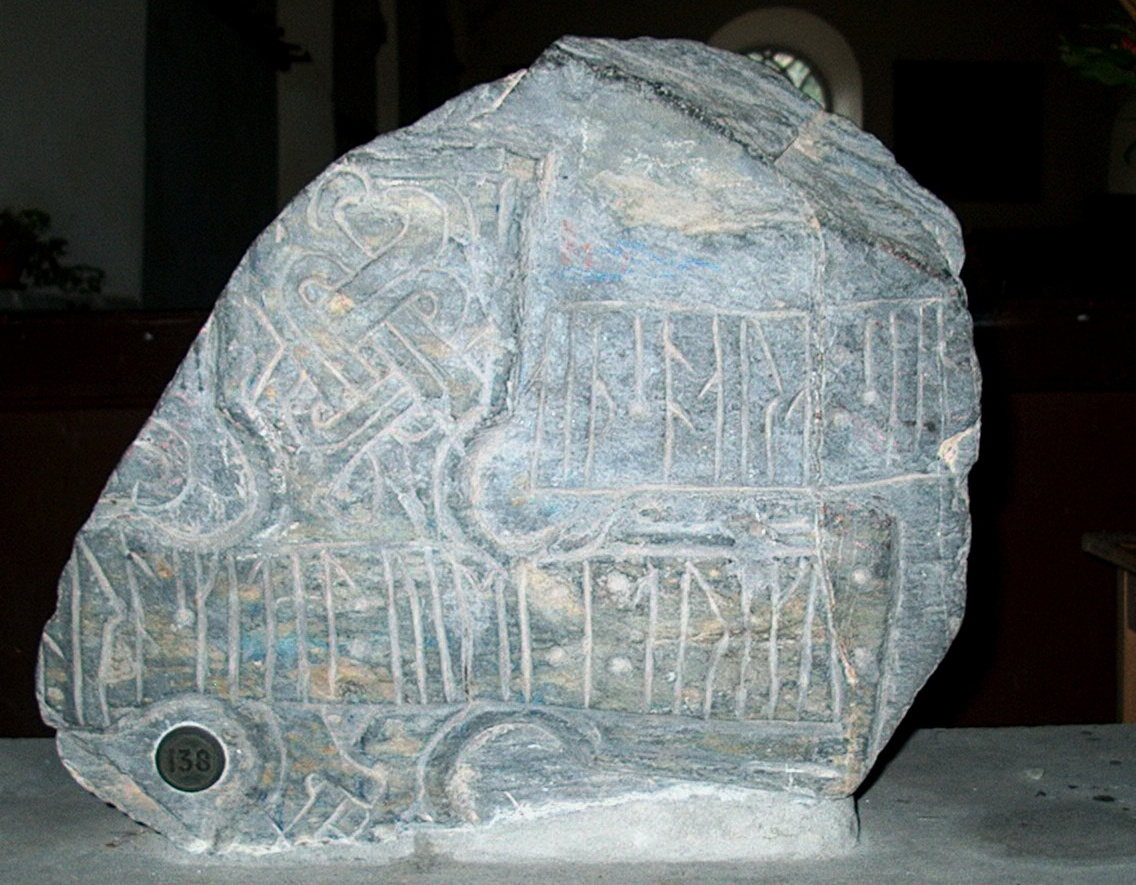
Br Olsen;191A

This stone cross is found in the church Braddan. The inscription consists of short-twig runes and it is dated to the second half of the 10th century. It reports betrayal.

... ...(n) roskitil : uilti : i : triku : aiþsoara : siin
... [e]n Hrossketill {} vélti {} í {} tryggu {} eiðsvara {} sinn.
"... but Hrosketill betrayed the faith of his sworn confederate."

=== Br Olsen;191B (Braddan (III), MM 136) ===
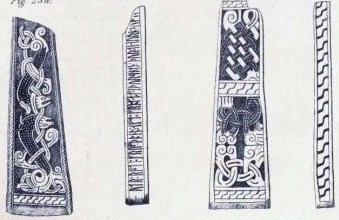
Br Olsen;191B

This stone cross is found in the church Braddan. The inscription consists of short-twig runes and it is dated to the 980s. The runemaster is identified as man named Thorbjörn, who also made Br Olsen;193A, below. It has been badly damaged since it was recorded.

utr : risti : krus : þono : aft : fro(k)(a) [: f](a)(þ)[ur sin : in :] (þ)[urbiaurn : ...]
Oddr {} reisti {} kross {} þenna {} ept {} Frakka, {} fǫður sinn, {} en {} Þorbjǫrn {} ...
"Oddr raised this cross in memory of Frakki, his father, but ... ..."

=== Br Olsen;193A (Braddan (IV), MM 135) ===
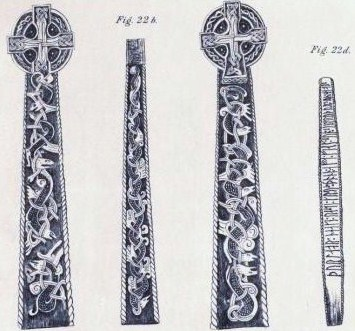
Br Olsen;193A

This runestone which is dated to the 980s is found in the church Braddan. The inscription consists of short-twig runes and they were made by the runemaster Thorbjörn, like Br Olsen;191B, above. It was made in memory of a son.

þurlibr : nhaki : risti : krus : þono : aft [:] fiak : s(u)[n] (s)in : (b)ruþur:sun : habrs × {IHSVS}
Þorleifr {} Hnakki {} reisti {} kross {} þenna {} ept {} Fiak, {} son sinn, {} bróðurson {} Hafrs. {} {ihsvs>}
"Þorleifr the Neck raised this cross in memory of Fiak, his son, Hafr's brothers son. ⟨ihsvs⟩"

=== Br Page1998;20 (Braddan (V), MM 176) ===
This fragment of a runestone is located in Manx Museum. It is probably from the Viking Age, but as of 2006, it had not yet been analysed.

=== Br NOR1992;6A (Braddan (VI), MM 200) ===
This runestone consists of a fragment of slate. It is dated to the Viking Age and it is located in Manx Museum. The only message that remains consists of "made".

...---r—nr * kirþi * ...
... {} gerði {} ...
"... made ..."

gerði would also translate into modern Swedish as gjorde or English did ... The meaning of the words made or did depends on the original context of the sentence as a whole (or at least the words surrounding this single word), which here appears lost.

The current use of the Swedish word gjorde is much more closely related to did than the word made. Which is intended is impossible to say here.

== Bride parish ==
=== Br Olsen;193B (MM 118) ===
This stone cross is found in the church Bride. The inscription consists of short-twig runes and it is dated to between 930 and 950. It was raised in memory of a wife.

[t]ruian : sur [t]u(f)kals : raisti krs þina : a(f)[t] aþmiu... : kunu si[n...]
Druian, {} sonr Dufgals, {} reisti kross þenna {} ept Aþmiu[l], {} konu sín[a].
"Druian, Dufgal's son raised this cross in memory of Aþmiu[l], his wife."

== Onchan parish ==
=== Br Olsen;194 (MM 141) ===
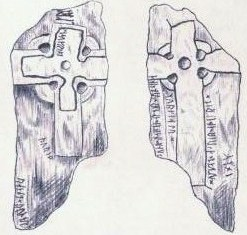
Br Olsen;194

This runestone consists of a short-twig runic inscription on an old Irish stone cross. The inscriptions A, B and C date from the Viking Age, while D is later. A and B were made by the same scribe, C and D were made by a second and a third one, while a fourth scribe made E, F and G.

...(a) sunr × raisti × if(t) [k](u)[i](n)(u) (s)(i)(n)(a) ×
... sonr {} reisti {} ept konu sína {}
"...'s son raised (this) in memory of his wife"

murkialu × m...
Myrgjǫl {} ...
"Myrgjǫl ..."

× uk ik at × auk raþ ik r...t ×
{} Hygg ek {} at ok ræð ek r[é]tt. {}
"I examine (the runes) and I interpret (them) rightly.(?)"

a=læns
Alleins.
"in agreement(?)"

kru...
Kro[ss]
"Cross"

isu krist
Jésu Krist
"Jesus Christ"

þuriþ × raist × rune... ×
Þúríð {} reist {} rúna[r]. {}
"Þúríð carved the runes."

== German parish ==
=== Br Olsen;199 (German (I), MM 107) ===
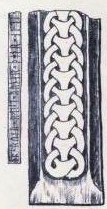
Br Olsen;199

This stone cross is located in the chapel of Saint John. The inscription is in short-twig runes and it is dated to between 930 and 950. The inscription is secondary and it is poorly preserved. Only a few main staffs are visible.

... in o(s)(r)(u)(þ)(r) : raist : runar : þsar {× ¶} ----- -
... En Ásrøðr {} reist {} rúnar {} þessar. {} ... ...
"... and Ásrøðr carved these runes. ... ..."

=== Br Olsen;200A (German (II), MM 140) ===
Br Olsen;200A

This stone cross is found in Manx Museum. The inscription is in short-twig runes, but it may be later than the Viking Age. It was inscribed in memory of a wife.

... ... ...(u)s * þense * efter * asriþi * kunu sina * (t)(u)(t)ur * ut... ...-
... ... [kr]oss {} þenna {} eptir {} Ástríði, {} konu sína, {} dóttur {} Odd[s]. ...
"... ... this cross in memory of Ástríðr, his wife, Oddr's daughter ..."

== Jurby parish ==
=== Br Olsen;200B (MM 127) ===
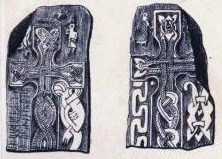
Br Olsen;200B

This stone cross is found in Jurby and the short-twig runes are dated to the second half of the 10th century. It has been badly damaged since it was recorded. One of the figures depicted on the cross holds a small sword in his right hand and an Alpine horn in his left while a raven flies overhead. It has been suggested that this figure represents the Norse pagan deity Heimdall holding the Gjallarhorn, used to announce the coming of Ragnarök.

[... ... ...un * si]n : in : onon : raiti ¶ --- * aftir þurb-...
... ... [s]on {} sinn, {} en {} annan {} reisti/rétti {} [hann](?) {} eptir Þor...
"... ... his son and raised(?) another ... in memory of Þorb-..."

== Marown parish ==
=== Br Olsen;201 (MM 139) ===
This stone cross is located in Saint Trinian's chapel. The short-twig inscription is dated to the Viking Age.

þurbiaurn : risti : krus : þ(o)-...
Þorbjǫrn {} reisti {} kross {} þe[nna].
"Þorbjǫrn raised this cross."

== Maughold parish ==
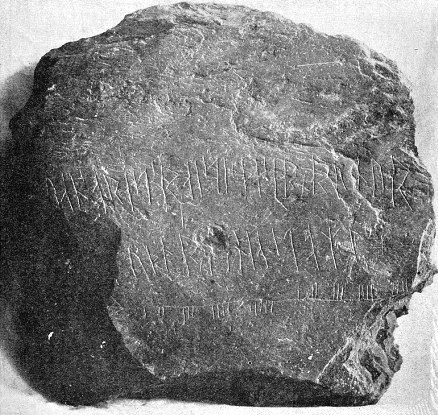
Maughold Stone I with runic and Ogham inscription

=== Br Olsen;202A (Maughold (I), MM 145) ===
This runic inscription is found on a stone slab that was used in a grave. It is located near the church Maughold. The inscription is dated to the second half of the 12th century, and it was made by the same runemaster as Br Olsen;202B. On the stone can also be seen the first half of the Ogham alphabet.

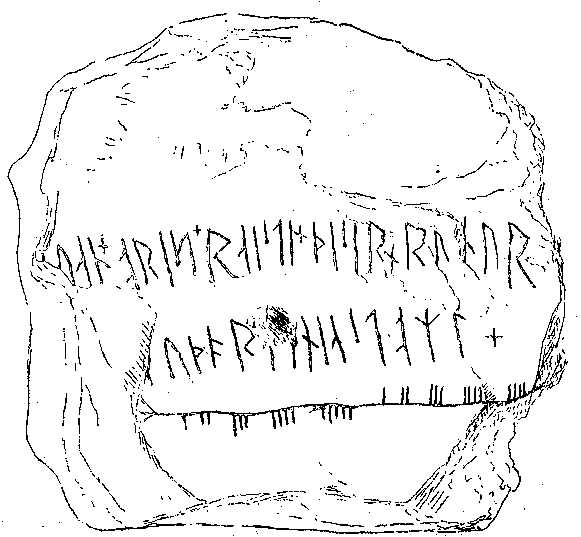
Maughold Stone I – Drawing of the inscriptions

(i)(u)an + brist + raisti + þasir + runur +¶ [f]uþor(k)(h)niastbml +
Jóan {} prestr {} reisti {} þessar {} rúnar. {} ⟨fuþorkhniastbml⟩ {}
"Jóan the priest carved these runes. Fuþorkhniastbml"

=== Br Olsen;202B (Maughold (II), MM 144) ===
This inscription is found on a slab of stone that was used in a grave. It was discovered at the upper end of the Corna valley, but is now at the church Maughold. The short-twig inscription is dated to the second half of the 12th century and it was made by the same runemaster as Br Olsen;202A.

+ krisþ : malaki : ok baþr(i)k : (a)þ(a)(n)man {(×) ¶ ÷} [...nal] * sauþ * a... * iuan * brist * i kurnaþal *
{} Kristr, {} Malaki {} ok Patrik. {} Adamnán {} ... {} ... {} ... {} Jóan {} prestr {} í Kornadal. {}
"Christ, Malachi, and Patrick. Adamnán ... Joán the priest in Kornadalr."

=== Br Olsen;205A (Maughold (III), MM 133) ===
This fragment of a stone cross was found in Ballagilley. It is now located at the church Maughold. It is dated to the Viking Age but only four runes remain of the inscription.

=== Br Olsen;205B (Maughold (IV), MM 142) ===
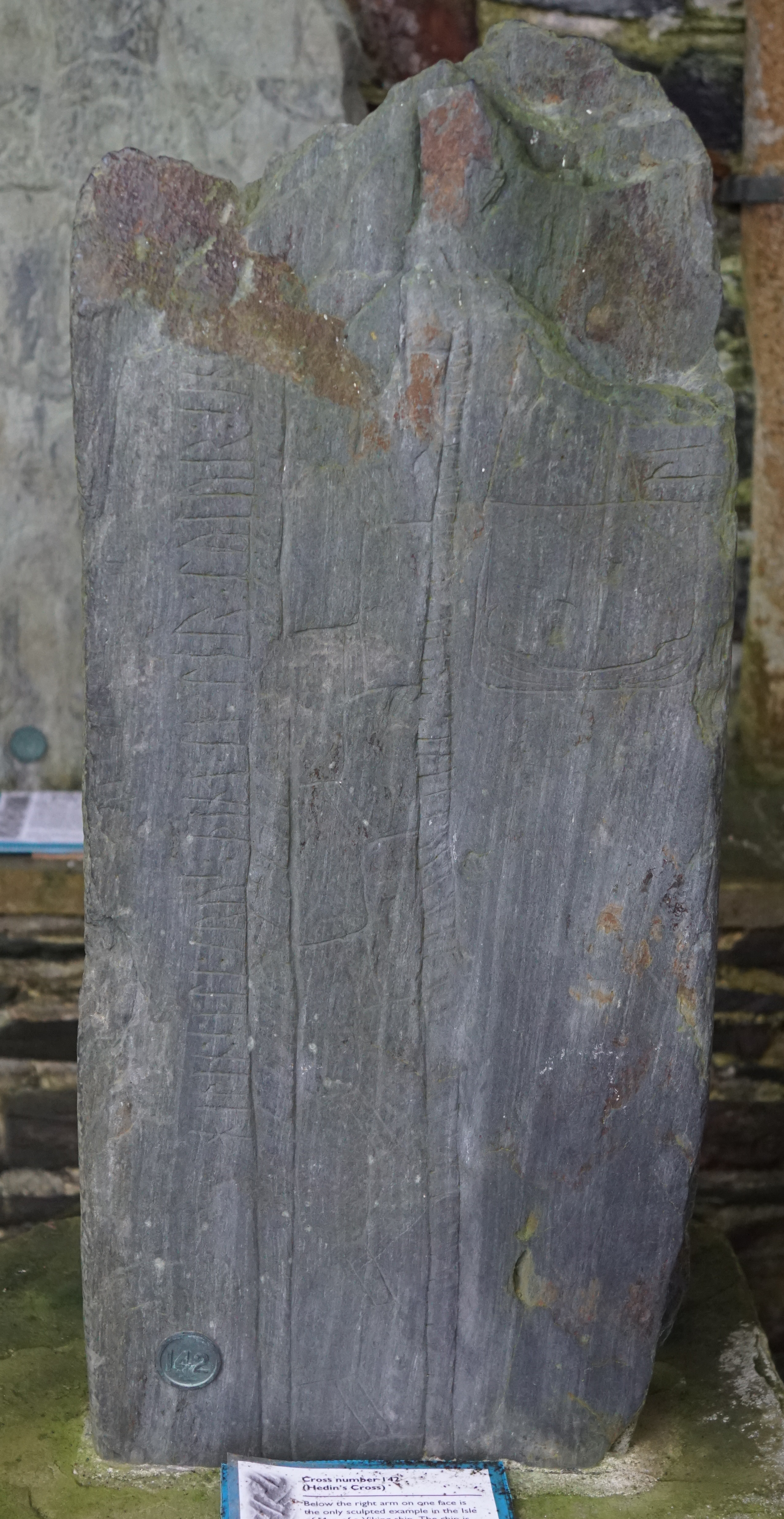
Br Olsen;205B

This inscription is dated to c. 1000 and found on a slab of stone that was used in a grave, and it is located at the church Maughold. The inscription is in long-branch runes, except for the s rune, and there is reason to believe that it was made by a visitor to the Isle of Man.

heþin : seti : krus : þino : eftir : tutur : sino ¶ lif... ¶ lifilt
Heðinn {} setti {} kross {} þenna {} eptir {} dóttur {} sína {} Hlíf[hildi]. {} Hlífhildi.
"Heðinn placed this cross in memory of his daughter Hlíf(hildr). Hlífhildr."

arni : risti : runar : þisar
Árni {} risti {} rúnar {} þessar.
"Árni carved these runes."

sikuþr
Sigurðr.
"Sigurðr."

=== Br Page1998;21 (Maughold (V), MM 175) ===
This inscription is found on a slab of stone that was used in a grave. It is located in the Manx Museum. It is in short-twig runes and it is dated to the Viking Age. It was engraved in memory of a wife.

kuan sunr × mailb—ak... + kirþi + lik+tinn i(f)tir {+ ¶ +} kuina sina +
⟨kuan⟩, sonr {} ⟨mailb---ak...⟩ {} gerði {} líkstein(?) eptir {} kona sína. {}
"⟨kuan⟩, son of ⟨mailb---ak...⟩ made the tomb-stone(?) in memory of his wife."

== Michael parish ==
=== Br Olsen;208A (Kirk Michael (I), MM 102) ===
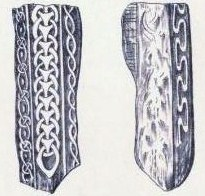
Br Olsen;208A

This fragment of a stone cross is located in the church Kirk Michael. The inscription in short-twig runes is dated to the Viking Age.

... [kru](s) : þna : af[tir : ...]
... kross {} þenna {} eptir {} ...
"... this cross in memory of ..."

=== Br Olsen;208B (Kirk Michael (II), MM 101) ===
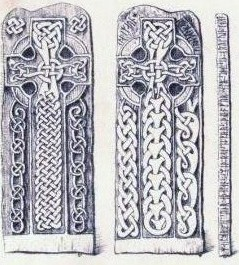
Br Olsen;208B

This stone cross is located in the church Kirk Michael, and it is dated to the Viking Age. The inscription is in short-twig runes and it was dedicated to a man while he was alive.

× mail:brikti : sunr : aþakans : smiþ : raisti : krus : þano : fur :¶ salu : sina : sin:bruku in : kaut ×¶ kirþi : þano : auk ¶ ala : i maun ×
{} Melbrigði, {} sonr {} Aðakáns {} Smiðs, {} reisti {} kross {} þenna {} fyr {} sálu {} sína {} synd...(?), en {} Gautr {} gerði {} þenna {} ok {} alla {} í Mǫn. {}
"Melbrigði, the son of Aðakán the Smith, raised this cross for his sin ... soul, but Gautr made this and all in Man."

=== Br Olsen;215 (Kirk Michael (III), MM 130) ===
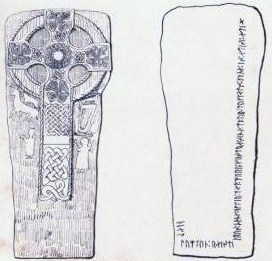
Br Olsen;215

This is an old Irish stone cross that received an inscription in long branch runes, and it was probably by a Danish visitor in the 11th century. There are ogham inscriptions on both sides.

mal:lymkun : raisti : krus : þena : efter : mal:mury : fustra : si(n)e : tot(o)r : tufkals : kona : is : aþisl : ati {+ ¶} ...etra : es : laifa : fustra : kuþan : þan : son : ilan +
⟨mallymkun⟩ {} reisti {} kross {} þenna {} eptir {} ⟨malmury⟩ {} fóstra {} sín, {} dóttir {} Dufgals, {} kona {} er {} Aðísl {} átti. {} Betra {} er {} leifa {} fóstra {} góðan {} en {} son {} illan. {}
"⟨Mallymkun⟩ raised this cross in memory of ⟨Malmury⟩, his foster(-mother?), Dufgal's daughter, the wife whom Aðísl owned (= was married to). (It) is better to leave a good foster-son than a wretched son."

=== Br Olsen;217A (Kirk Michael (IV), MM 126) ===
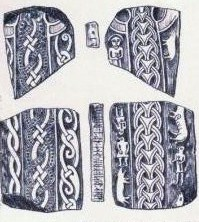
Br Olsen;217A

This is a stone cross that is found in the church Michael. The inscription with short-twig runes was made in the second half of the 11th century.

[k](r)i(m) : risti : krus : þna : ift : rum(u)... ...
Grímr {} reisti {} kross {} þenna {} ept {} Hróðmu[nd] ...
"Grímr raised this cross in memory of Hróðmundr ... his ..."

=== Br Olsen;217B (Kirk Michael (V), MM 132) ===
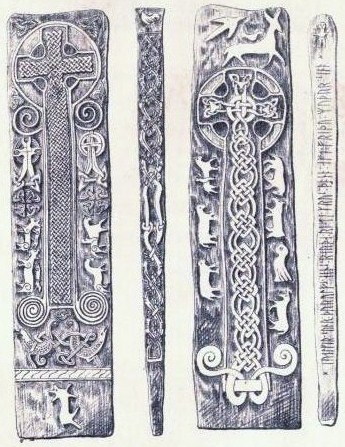
Br Olsen;217A

This is a stone cross that is located in the church Michael. The inscription in short-twig runes was made in the 980s by a runemaster named Thorbjörn.

+ iualfir : sunr : þurulfs : hins : rauþa : ris(t)i : krus : þono : aft : friþu : muþur : sino +
{} ⟨iualfir⟩, {} sonr {} Þórulfs {} hins {} Rauða, {} reisti {} kross {} þenna {} ept {} Fríðu, {} móður {} sína. {}
"⟨iualfir⟩, the son of Þórulfr the Red, raised this cross in memory of Fríða, his mother."

=== Br Olsen;218A (Kirk Michael (VI), MM 129) ===
Br Olsen;218A

This stone cross is located in the church Michael. It was engraved with short-twig runes in the second half of the 10th century.

... (k)rims : ins : suarta ×
... Gríms/...gríms {} hins {} Svarta. {}
"... (of) Grímr/-grímr the Black."

=== Br Olsen;218B (Kirk Michael (VII), MM 110) ===
This fragment of a stone cross is located in the church Kirk Michael. The inscription was made in short-twig runes between 930 and 950.

... runar ...
... rúnar ...
"... runes ..."

=== Br Olsen;219 (Kirk Michael (VIII), MM 123) ===
This fragment of a stone cross is located in the church Kirk Michael. The inscription was made during the Viking Age with short-twig runes.

... : [ai](f)(t)(i)(r) * (m)(u)... * (u)...
... {} eptir {} ⟨mu-⟩ {} ...
"... in memory of ⟨mu-⟩ ..."

== See also ==
- Picture stone
