= Troll cat =

Witch's familiar in Scandinavian folklore

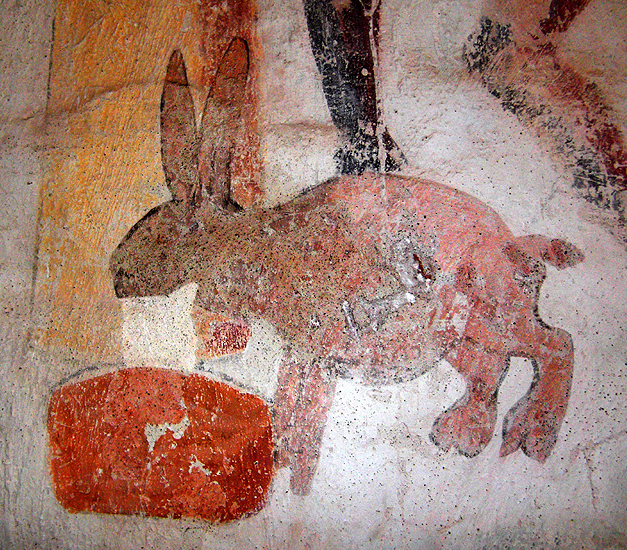
"Swedish milk hare", 15th century wall painting by Albertus Pictor, Uppsala County

A troll cat is the familiar of a witch in Scandinavian folklore. Troll cats sucked milk from cows and spat it out in the witches' milk pails, and went into homes to lick up cream. Aside from cats, similar creatures include the milk rabbit, milk hare, and ball-shaped troll ball.

== Description ==
Witches reportedly were able to create them from "human hair, nails, wood shavings, and the like", and they were said to suck milk from cows and steal cream from households. Troll cats would then spit out the stolen milk into troughs next to the house. The Norwegian names trollnøste and trollnøa indicate their shapes: those troll cats looked like balls of yarn. Another kind of troll cat had the appearance of an ordinary cat; but, unlike the ball-shaped troll cat, harming the cat-shaped troll cat would result in the same harm to the witch. In addition, it was thought that shooting a troll cat would cause milk to spray from its wound. The troll cat is easily confused with the witch's hug, which could also assume the shape of a cat. The troll cat would have to be buried with the witch, or the witch would have to leave her grave to retrieve it.

Peter Christen Asbjørnsen, a scholar of Norwegian folklore, retells a story in which Gypsies took advantage of farmers' beliefs in troll cats by stealing milk and blaming it on troll cats, a story they would then render believable by digging up a previously buried "bladder filled with red water surrounded by a cat-skin". Norwegian novelist Johan Bojer recalled an incident from 1914, when he was a lieutenant in the Army. The local women decided to raise the rent for the soldiers and he refused them permission to do so. He fell ill, and his three-day illness was explained by one of the women as a result of a troll cat having been sicced on him.

A related creature is the tilberi, a milk thief and witches' aide in Icelandic folklore. The tilberi (also called snakkur, a spindle "made from a dead man's rib, stolen wool, and communion wine") plays the same role as the troll cat. One Icelandic farmer chased one on horseback and at long last it hid under the skirts of a farmer's wife. The skirt was tied up so the thief couldn't escape, and the woman was burned.

== Explanation ==
The existence of troll cats appears to be related to the observation of matter (such as hair) regurgitated by cattle. The slime mold Fuligo septica and the foam made by spittle bugs were seen as troll cat droppings. Also offered as an explanation for the belief in troll cats is the Norwegian Forest Cat, a particularly long-haired domestic cat bred in Northern Europe.

== See also ==
- Tilberi, another witch-created milk thief
- Tremella mesenterica, "witches' butter," a fungus believed to have spewed by witches' "carriers"
