= Ægishjálmur (occult symbol) =

Icelandic magical stave

The occult symbol most commonly associated with the name Ægishjálmur.

Ægishjálmur in Icelandic, or Helm of Awe in English, is a name given to a number of occult symbols, mainly from Iceland, so called galdrastafir ("incantation staves"). The name is a borrowing from Norse mythology, where it is the name of a magic item, the Helm of Awe, belonging to a treasure hoard. The most famous of these symbols stems from the grimoire Galdrakver (A Book Of Magic) from c. 1670.

== Etymology ==
The name is a compound of Old Norse: œgir, "one who frightens", stemming from agi, "awe, feeling of fear and reverence, reverent obedience through deterrent terror", and hjálmr, "helmet".

== Origin ==
Magical symbols became popular in Iceland around the sixteenth to seventeenth centuries, inspired by medieval Latin magical texts from Continental Europe such as the Liber Razielis Archangeli and Clavis Salomonis and spurred on by the imposition of Lutheran Christianity on them by the Danish monarch in 1550. The closest parallel for the later Icelandic Ægishjálmur symbol identified by Bauer and Pesch appears in a series of magical symbols known as pentacles found in a Greek text called Hygromanteia whose earliest manuscripts (such as London, British Library, Harley MS 5596) are from the fifteenth century.

Icelandic books of magic are more common from the seventeenth century onwards, and symbols named Ægishjálmur appear often. The earliest example is the Galdrabók composed between 1550 and 1650. The earliest example cited by Bauer and Pesch is an anonymous work from 1670 known as the Galdrakver found in the late seventeenth-century in the collection of Bishop Hannes Finnsson by Jón Árnason and rebound in 1865. Symbols named Ægishjálmur also show considerable diversity of form. Meanwhile, similar symbols also appear under other names, including Þórshamar ("hammer of Thor") and Þjófastafar ("thieves' symbols", i.e. symbols to use when magically identifying thieves). Bauer and Pesch concluded that "all in all, there is a lot of variation, and it seems that neither the names nor the specific shapes of the figures were standardised".

== Grimoire descriptions ==
=== Galdrabók (c. 1550–1650) ===
"One should clip or cut these helms of awe onto one’s livestock if they get swooning or pestilence, and the first one should be put on the left shoulder and the other one on the right. Likewise, while fasting, make the latter (helm of awe) with your spittle in your palm when you greet the girl whom you want to have. It should be the right hand."

=== Galdrakver (c. 1670) ===
"Terror Helm. It shall be made in lead, and when a man expects his enemies he shall imprint it on his forehead. And thou wilt conquer him. It is as follows."

=== LBS 2413 8vo (c. 1800) ===
"These are the nine Helms of Awe that no one can be without who will handle knowledge and each one should be used 99 times."

== 21st-century use ==
Flag of the neo-Nazi Party of the Swedes, which has been argued partly to have been inspired by the Ægishjálmur symbol

According of Bauer and Pesch, just as "the Icelanders adopted the ancient tradition of kaballistic grimoires and partially attributed new meanings to it, [...] modern people again claim the right to reinterpret old symbols for themselves", and symbols labelled Ægishjálmur have become widespread in popular culture, found for example on tattoos, t-shirts and pendants, where they are often marketed as and understood to be "Viking" in origin.

In twenty-first-century culture, the Ægishjálmur symbol is often confused with another modern symbol known as Vegvísir, and designs exist that include features of both. In 2023, Bauer and Pesch found that

while Vegvísir, though widely used today, is rarely found in radical right-wing groups, Ægishjálmur enjoys a higher level of popularity there: the martial references attributed to this symbol today make it attractive for some predominantly male, combative groups. Ægishjálmur has not yet become an official and distinctive label, although similar designs, such as star-shaped figures with trident-like ends, are being used by right-wing extremists.

Accordingly, the Ægishjálmur symbol influenced the logo of the neo-Nazi Swedish political party Svenskarnas parti, which existed from 2008 to 2015.

== Link between the item and symbol ==
While it is debated whether the Helm of Awe may have been an actual helm, in medieval sources, it never references a symbol such as that recorded in the modern period. The meaning of the word used to define the helm seemed to change as years went on, going from a physical object to a voracious trait of striking fear into one with a glance.

== See also ==
- Vegvísir – another Icelandic magical stave first recorded in the modern period
- Sigil – a type of magical symbol
