= Bejsebakke =

Coordinates: 57.0275°N 9.8906°E

Bejsebakke or Sorthøj is a locality in Ansgar Parish, Fleskum Herred, Aalborg Municipality, Denmark where traces of prehistoric settlements from both the Stone Age, Bronze Age and Iron Age were found. The area have been archaeologically excavated two times. In 1958 an excavation was conducted by the National Museum of Denmark and in the years 1999 and 2000 by the Aalborg Historical Museum. This excavation was found among other traces more than 350 pit houses and 40-50 large houses from the Iron Age. The area is also rich in relics of the Stone Age flint mines.
