= Icelandic magical staves =

Symbols believed to possess magical properties

Icelandic magical staves (Icelandic: galdrastafir, lit. 'galder staves', "incantation staves") are sigils that were credited with supposed magical effect preserved in various Icelandic grimoires, such as the Galdrabók, dating from the 17th century and later.

== Table of magical staves ==
Icelandic name	Manuscript description	Image
Að fá stúlku	"To get a girl", this magical stave is used by a man in love to gain the affections of the object of his desires.	
Ægishjálmur	Helm of Awe (or Helm of Terror); to induce fear, protect the warrior, and prevail in battle.	
Angurgapi	Carved on the ends of barrels to prevent leaking.	
Brýnslustafir	For use on whetstones.	
Draumstafir	To dream of unfulfilled desires.	
Dreprún	To kill an enemy's cattle.	
Feingur	A fertility symbol.	
Gapaldur	Two staves, kept in the shoes, gapaldur under the heel of the right foot and ginfaxi under the toes of the left foot, to magically ensure victory in bouts of Icelandic wrestling (glíma).	
Ginfaxi	Two staves, kept in the shoes, gapaldur under the heel of the right foot and ginfaxi under the toes of the left foot, to magically ensure victory in bouts of Icelandic wrestling (glíma).	
Hólastafur	To open hills.	
Kaupaloki	To prosper in trade and business.	
Lásabrjótur	To open a lock without a key.	
Lukkustafir	Whoever carries this symbol with them encounters no evil, neither on the sea nor on the land.	
Máladeilan	To win in court.	
Nábrókarstafur	A stave used when making necropants (nábrók), a pair of trousers made from the skin of a dead man that are capable of producing an endless supply of money.	
Skelkunarstafur	To make your enemies afraid. (A similar-looking stave is titled Óttastafur in the Huld Manuscript.)	
Rosahringur minni	A lesser circle of protection.	
Smjörhnútur	Butterknot, to find out if butter was made using milk stolen by a Tilberi.	
Stafur gegn galdri	Staves against witchcraft.	
Stafur til að vekja upp draug	To raise the dead and drive away evil spirits.	
Þjófastafur	For use against thieves.	
Tóustefna	To ward off foxes.	
Varnarstafur Valdemars	Valdemar's Protection Stave; increases favor and happiness.	
Vatnahlífir	Protection against drowning.	
Vegvísir	To guide people through rough weather.	
Veiðistafur	For luck in fishing.	

== See also ==
- Galdr
- Hex sign
- Runic magic
