= Galdrabók =

Historic Icelandic grimoire

The galdrabók

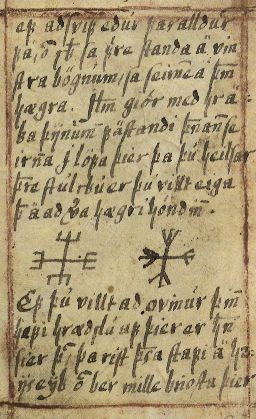
Page from the Galdrabók about the Ægishjálmur occult symbol

The galdrabók (Note: Icelandic pronunciation: [ˈkaltraˌpouːk].) (lit. 'galder book', "incantation book"; cf. "cook book") is an Icelandic grimoire dated to c. 1600. It is a small manuscript containing a collection of 47 spells and sigils/staves.

The grimoire was compiled by four people, possibly starting in the late 16th century and going on until the mid-17th century. The first three scribes were Icelanders, and the fourth was a Dane working from Icelandic material. The various spells consist of Latin and runic material as well as Icelandic magical staves, invocations to Christian entities, demons, and the Norse gods, as well as instructions for the use of herbs and magical items. Some of the spells are protective, intended to work against problems such as trouble with childbearing, headache, insomnia, previous incantations, pestilence, suffering, and distress at sea. Others are intended to cause fear, kill animals, find thieves, put someone to sleep, cause flatulence, or bewitch women.

The book was first published in 1921 by Natan Lindqvist in a diplomatic edition and with a Swedish translation, under the Swedish title: "An Icelandic grimoire from the 1500s" (Swedish: En isländsk svartkonstbok från 1500-talet). An English translation was published in 1989 by Stephen Flowers, and a facsimile edition with detailed commentary by Matthías Viðar Sæmundsson in 1992. In 1995, Flowers produced a second retitled edition of his book and with the assistance of Sæmundsson corrected many translations and added many more notes and commentaries.

In 2024, a new illustrated English-Icelandic edition of the Galdrabók by Icelandic folklorist Kári Pálsson was published with the previously unpublished Jarðskinna manuscript, a small Icelandic grimoire.
