= Tilberi =

Creature of Icelandic folklore

The tilberi (carrier) or snakkur (spindle) is a creature of Icelandic folklore, created by witches to steal milk. Only women can create and own them.

The two terms are regional variants: both are used in eastern Iceland, 'tilberi' in the north and 'snakkur' in the south and west. There are no written mentions of the creatures before the 17th century, although one 17th-century writer mentions a witch being punished for having one in 1500.

To create a tilberi, the woman steals a rib from a recently buried body early on Whitsunday, twists around it grey wool which she must steal for the purpose and keeps it between her breasts. (It is sometimes specified that the wool must be plucked from between the shoulders of a widow's sheep soon after its wool has been plucked.) The next three Sundays at communion she spits the sanctified wine on the bundle, which will come more alive each time. She then lets it suckle on the inside of her thigh, which creates a tell-tale wartlike growth.

The woman can now send the tilberi to suck milk from others' cows and ewes. It will return to the window of her dairy and call out "Full belly, Mummy!" or "Churn lid off, Mummy!" and vomit the stolen milk into her butter churn. To suck the milk from the animal's udder, it jumps on her back and lengthens itself to reach down; in some versions it is said to be able to reach down on both sides to suck from two teats at once. Inflammatory hardening of the udder was traditionally ascribed to the tilberi, and as late as the 19th century, animals were protected by making the sign of the cross under the udder and over the rump and laying a Psalter on the spine. Butter churned from milk stolen by a tilberi will clump together as if curdled, or even melt away into foam, if the sign of the cross is made over it or the smjörhnútur (butterknot) magical sign drawn in it.

The tilberi also occasionally steals wool which has been put out to dry after shearing and washing; it rolls it around itself to form a giant moving ball.

If the woman has a child and the tilberi manages to reach her own milk-filled breast, she is at risk of being sucked to death. The traditional method of ridding oneself of a tilberi is to send it up the mountain to the common pasturage with orders to collect all the lambs' droppings; either all those in three pastures, or making three piles. The tilberi will then either work itself to death or die because as an evil creature it cannot tolerate the number three. Only the human bone will be left lying in the pasture.

A tilberi is very fast, but when chased it was believed to run home to its mother and hide under her skirts; her petticoat could then be tied or sewn closed under it and mother and creature either burnt or drowned together.

== See also ==
- Icelandic magical staves
- Troll cat, another witch-created milk thief, also known in Sweden and Finland as bjära, which also means 'carrier'

== Sources ==
- Butterknot - tilberi, Museum of Icelandic Sorcery and Witchcraft
