= Fensalir =

Dwelling of the goddess Frigg in Norse mythology

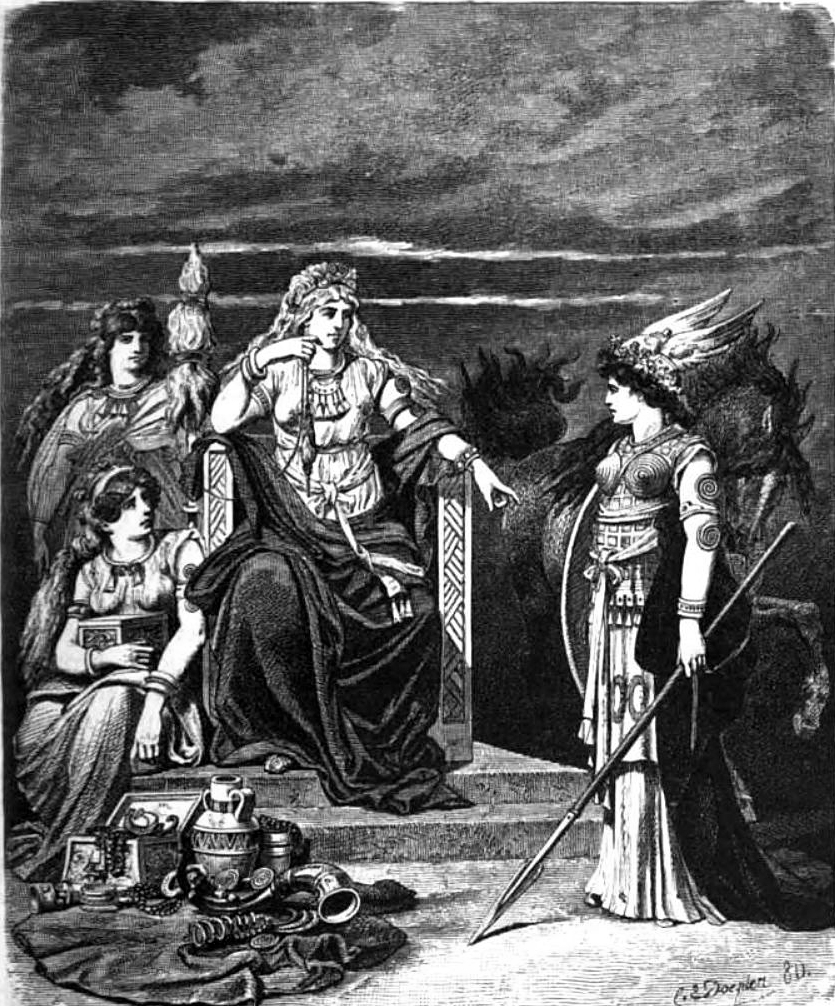
"Frigg and Her Servants" (1882) by Carl Emil Doepler.

In Norse mythology, Fensalir (Old Norse "Fen Halls") is a location where the goddess Frigg dwells. Fensalir is attested in the Poetic Edda, compiled in the 13th century from earlier traditional sources, and the Prose Edda, written in the 13th century by Snorri Sturluson. Scholars have proposed theories about the implications of the location, including that the location may have some connection to religious practices involving springs, bogs, or swamps in Norse paganism, and that it may be connected to the goddess Sága's watery location Sökkvabekkr.

== Attestations ==
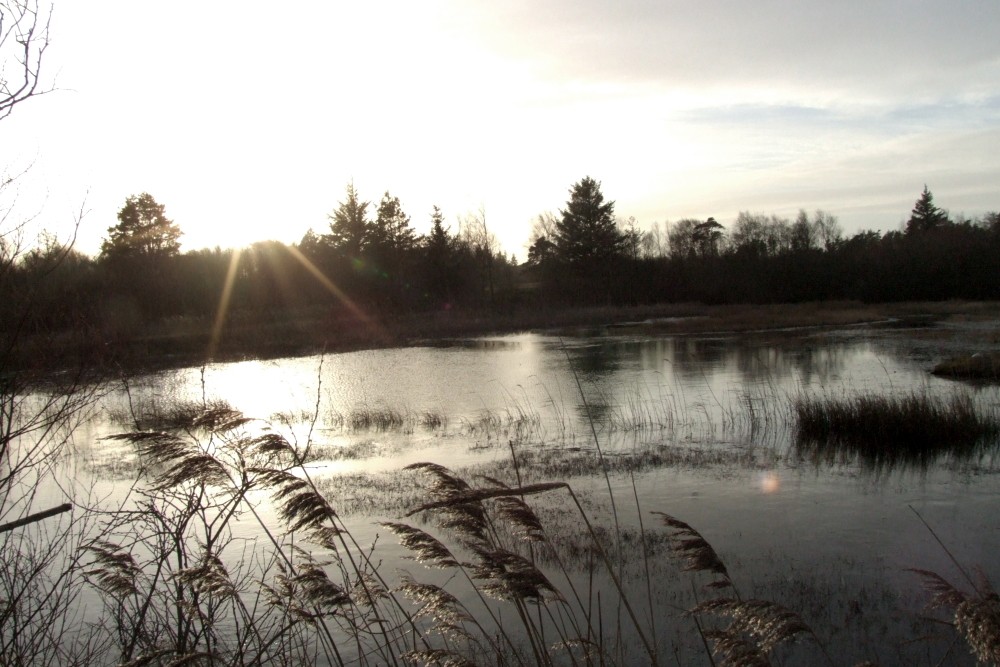
A bog in northern Jutland, Denmark.

In the Poetic Edda poem Völuspá, Frigg is described as weeping over her son Baldr's death in Fensalir. This stanza is absent in the Hauksbók manuscript of the poem. The portion of the stanza mentioning Fensalir foretells that vengeance will come for the death of Baldr and that:

while Frigg wept
in Fen Halls
for Valhǫll's woe.

In chapter 35 of the Prose Edda book Gylfaginning, High tells Gangleri (described as king Gylfi in disguise) that Frigg is the highest among the ásynjur or Aesir, and that "she has a dwelling called Fensalir and it is very splendid." In chapter 49, High says that when Loki witnessed that Baldr had gained invincibility due to the oath all things took not to harm him, Loki went to Fensalir appearing as a woman. In his disguise, Loki there asked Frigg why Baldr was not harmed by the objects. Frigg revealed that it is due to the oath they have taken. The disguised Loki asks if nothing can hurt Baldr, and Frigg reveals that only mistletoe can, for it seemed to her too young to demand an oath from. After this, Loki immediately disappears, and subsequently engineers the death of Baldr with a mistletoe projectile.

In the Prose Edda book Skáldskaparmál, Fensalir receives a third and final mention. In chapter 19, ways to refer to Frigg are provided, including that Frigg may be referred to as "queen of Æsir and Asyniur, of Fulla and falcon form and Fensalir."

== Theories ==
In 1882, the German scholar Anton Edzardi proposed that Fensalir may point to religious practices involving springs. John Lindow comments that "I have no idea why Frigg should live in a boggy place, despite the old argument that there is an association with a cult situated at a spring." Rudolf Simek comments that Edzardi's theory "must remain unanswered." In addition, Edzardi theorized a connection between Fensalir and a belief in folklore that particular swamps act as an entrance to the realm of Holda, whom he connects with Frigg.

In a 19th-century work, Paul Henri Mallet and Walter Scott write that the "fen" element of Fensalir "may also be made to sig[nify] the watery deep, or the sea." This etymology has resulted in theories that the name Fensalir may mean "Sea Halls" rather than "Fen Halls." In his 19th-century translation of the Poetic Edda, Henry Adams Bellows comments that "some scholars have regarded [Frigg] as a solar myth, calling her the sun-goddess, and pointing out that her home in Fensalir ("the sea-halls") symbolizes the daily setting of the sun beneath the ocean horizon."

John Lindow says that due to similarity between the goddess Sága's Sökkvabekkr and Fensalir, the open drinking between Sága and Odin, and the potential etymological basis for Sága being a seeress "have led most scholars to understand Sága as another name for Frigg." Stephan Grundy states that Sága and Sökkvabekkr may be by-forms of Frigg and Fensalir used for the purpose of composing alliterative verse.

Britt-Mari Näsström theorizes that "Frigg's role as a fertility goddess is revealed in the name of her abode, Fensalir [...]", that Frigg is the same as Sága, and that both the names Fensalir and Sökkvabekkr "imply a goddes [sic] living in the water and recall the fertility goddess Nerthus."
