= Frigg =

Germanic goddess

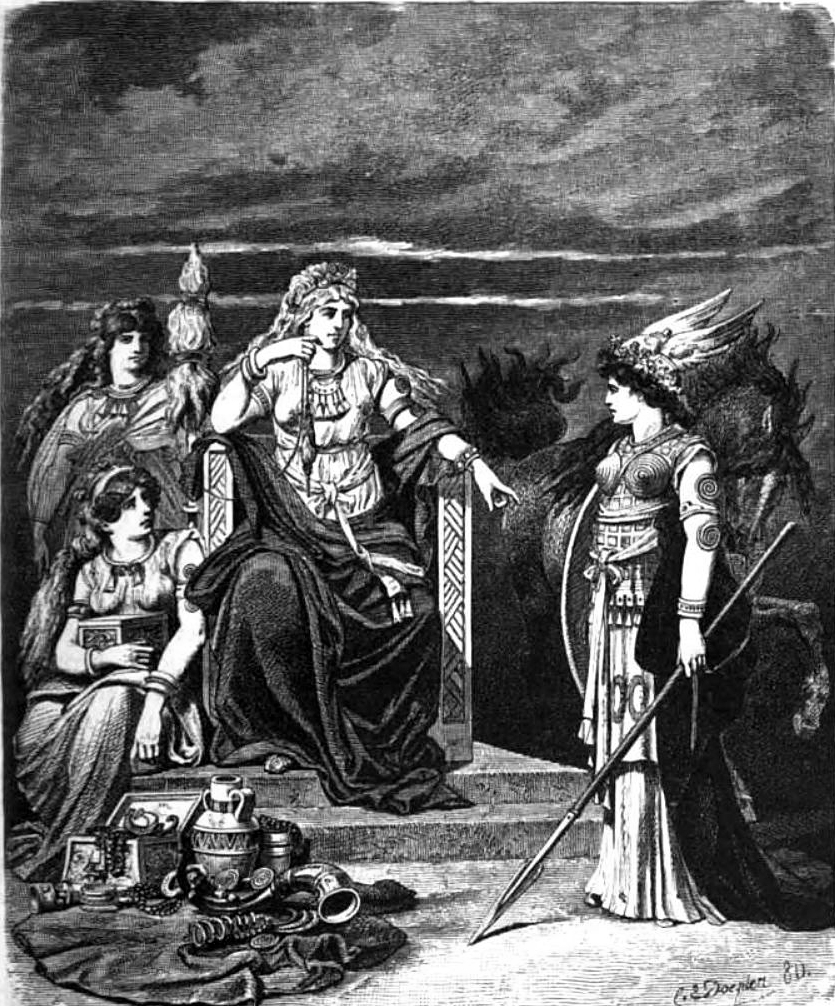
Frigg sits enthroned and facing the spear-wielding goddess Gná, flanked by two goddesses, one of whom (Fulla) carries her eski, a wooden box. Illustrated (1882) by Carl Emil Doepler.

Frigg (Old Norse: Frigg, /frɪɡ/, [ˈfriɡː], Old Swedish: Frigg, genitive: Friggiar, etc, Early Modern Swedish: Frigg etc; Old English: Frīg; Old Saxon: Frī; Old Frisian: Frīa; Old High German: Frīja; Lombardic: Frēa) is a goddess, one of the Æsir, in Germanic mythology. In Norse mythology, the source of most surviving information about her, she is associated with marriage, prophecy, clairvoyance and motherhood, and dwells in the wetland halls of Fensalir. The names ultimately stem from the Proto-Germanic theonym *Frijjō. Nearly all sources portray her as the wife of the god Odin.

In Old High German and Old Norse sources, she is specifically connected with Fulla, but she is also associated with the goddesses Lofn, Hlín, Gná, and ambiguously with the Earth, otherwise personified as an apparently separate entity Jörð (Old Norse: 'Earth'). The children of Frigg and Odin include the gleaming god Baldr.

The English weekday name Friday (ultimately meaning 'Frigg's Day') bears her name. After Christianization, the mention of Frigg continued to occur in Scandinavian folklore. During modern times, Frigg has appeared in popular culture, has been the subject of art and receives veneration in Germanic Neopaganism.

== Name and origin ==
=== Etymology ===
The theonyms Frigg (Old Norse), Frīja (Old High German), Frīg (Old English), Frīa (Old Frisian), and Frī (Old Saxon) are cognates (linguistic siblings from the same origin). They stem from the Proto-Germanic feminine noun *Frijjō, which emerged as a substantivized form of the adjective *frijaz ('free') via Holtzmann's law. In a clan-based societal system, the meaning 'free' arose from the meaning 'related'. The name is indeed etymologically close to the Sanskrit priyā and the Avestan fryā ('own, dear, beloved'), all ultimately descending from the Proto-Indo-European stem *priH-o-, denoting 'one's own, beloved'. The Proto-Germanic verb *frijōnan ('to love'), as well as the nouns *frijōndz ('friend') and *frijađwō ('friendship, peace'), are also related.

An -a suffix has been sometimes applied by modern editors to denote femininity, resulting in the form Frigga. This spelling also serves the purpose of distancing the goddess from the English word frig, with a primary meaning of masturbate or to the common alternative to the English profanity fuck. Several place names refer to Frigg in what are now Norway and Sweden, although her name is altogether absent in recorded place names in Denmark.

The name has several recorded forms in Old Swedish (1200–1525 AD) and Early Modern Swedish onward. Old Swedish forms includes: Frigg, Frigh, Freghe, Frege, Freye, Frey, Freya, Frea, Fria, etc. Later forms includes: Frigg, Frigga, Frigge, Friggie. Johannes Bureus recorded the Runic form ᚠᚱᚤᚼ (Frygh) in 1599.

=== Origin of Frigg ===
The connection with and possible earlier identification of the goddess Freyja with Frigg in the Proto-Germanic period is a matter of scholarly debate (see Frigg and Freyja common origin hypothesis). Like the name of the group of gods to which Freyja belongs, the Vanir, the name Freyja is not attested outside of Scandinavia. This is in contrast to the name of the goddess Frigg, who is also attested as a goddess among West Germanic peoples. Evidence is lacking for the existence of a common Germanic goddess from which Old Norse Freyja descends, but scholars have commented that this may simply be due to the scarcity of surviving sources.

Regarding the Freyja–Frigg common origin hypothesis, scholar Stephan Grundy writes that "the problem of whether Frigg or Freyja may have been a single goddess originally is a difficult one, made more so by the scantiness of pre-Viking Age references to Germanic goddesses, and the diverse quality of the sources. The best that can be done is to survey the arguments for and against their identity, and to see how well each can be supported."

=== Origin of Friday ===
The English weekday name Friday comes from Old English Frīġedæġ, meaning 'day of Frig'. It is cognate with Old Frisian Frīadei (≈ Fri(g)endei), Middle Dutch Vridach (≈ Vriendach), Middle Low German Vrīdach (≈ Vrīgedach), and Old High German Frîatac. The Old Norse Frjádagr was borrowed from a West Germanic language. All of these terms derive from Late Proto-Germanic *Frijjōdag ('Day of Frijjō'), a calque of Latin Veneris dies ('Day of Venus'; cf. modern Italian venerdì, French vendredi, Spanish viernes).

The Germanic goddess' name has substituted for the Roman name of a comparable deity, a practice known as interpretatio germanica. Although the Old English theonym Frīg is only found in the name of the weekday, it is also attested as a common noun in frīg ('love, affections [plural], embraces [in poetry]'). The Old Norse weekday Freyjudagr, a rare synonym of Frjádagr, saw the replacement of the first element with the genitive of Freyja.

== Attestations ==
=== Origo Gentis Langobardorum and Historia Langobardorum ===
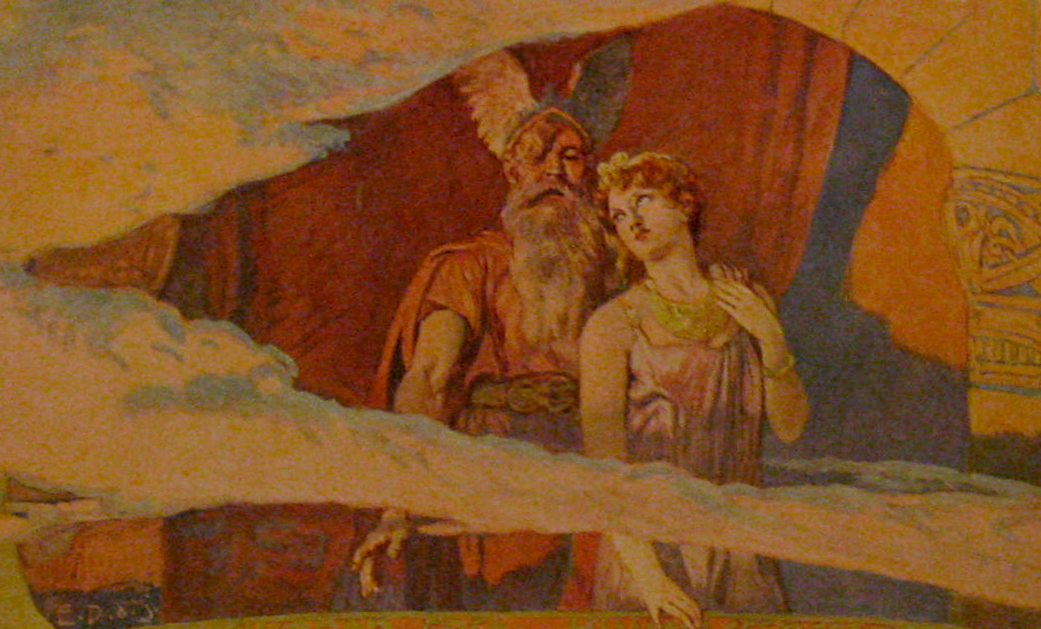
Godan and Frigg look down from their window in the heavens to the Winnili women in an illustration by Emil Doepler, 1905

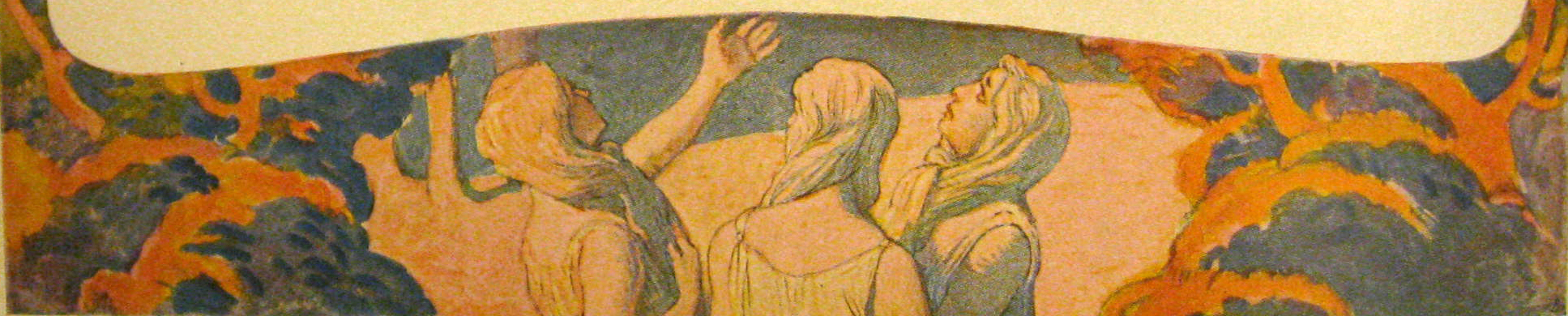
Winnili women with their hair tied as beards look up at Godan and Frigg in an illustration by Emil Doepler, 1905

The 7th-century Origo Gentis Langobardorum, and Paul the Deacon's 8th-century Historia Langobardorum derived from it, recount a founding myth of the Langobards, a Germanic people who ruled a region of what is now Italy (see Lombardy). According to this legend, a "small people" known as the Winnili were ruled by a woman named Gambara who had two sons, Ybor and Agio. The Vandals, ruled by Ambri and Assi, came to the Winnili with their army and demanded that they pay them tribute or prepare for war. Ybor, Agio, and their mother Gambara rejected their demands for tribute. Ambra and Assi then asked the god Godan for victory over the Winnili, to which Godan responded (in the longer version in the Origo): "Whom I shall first see when at sunrise, to them will I give the victory."

Meanwhile, Ybor and Agio called upon Frea, Godan's wife. Frea counseled them that "at sunrise the Winnil[i] should come, and that their women, with their hair let down around the face in the likeness of a beard should also come with their husbands". At sunrise, Frea turned Godan's bed around to face east and woke him. Godan saw the Winnili, including their whiskered women, and asked "who are those Long-beards?" Frea responded to Godan, "As you have given them a name, give them also the victory". Godan did so, "so that they should defend themselves according to his counsel and obtain the victory". Thenceforth the Winnili were known as the Langobards (Langobardic "long-beards").

=== Second Merseburg Incantation ===
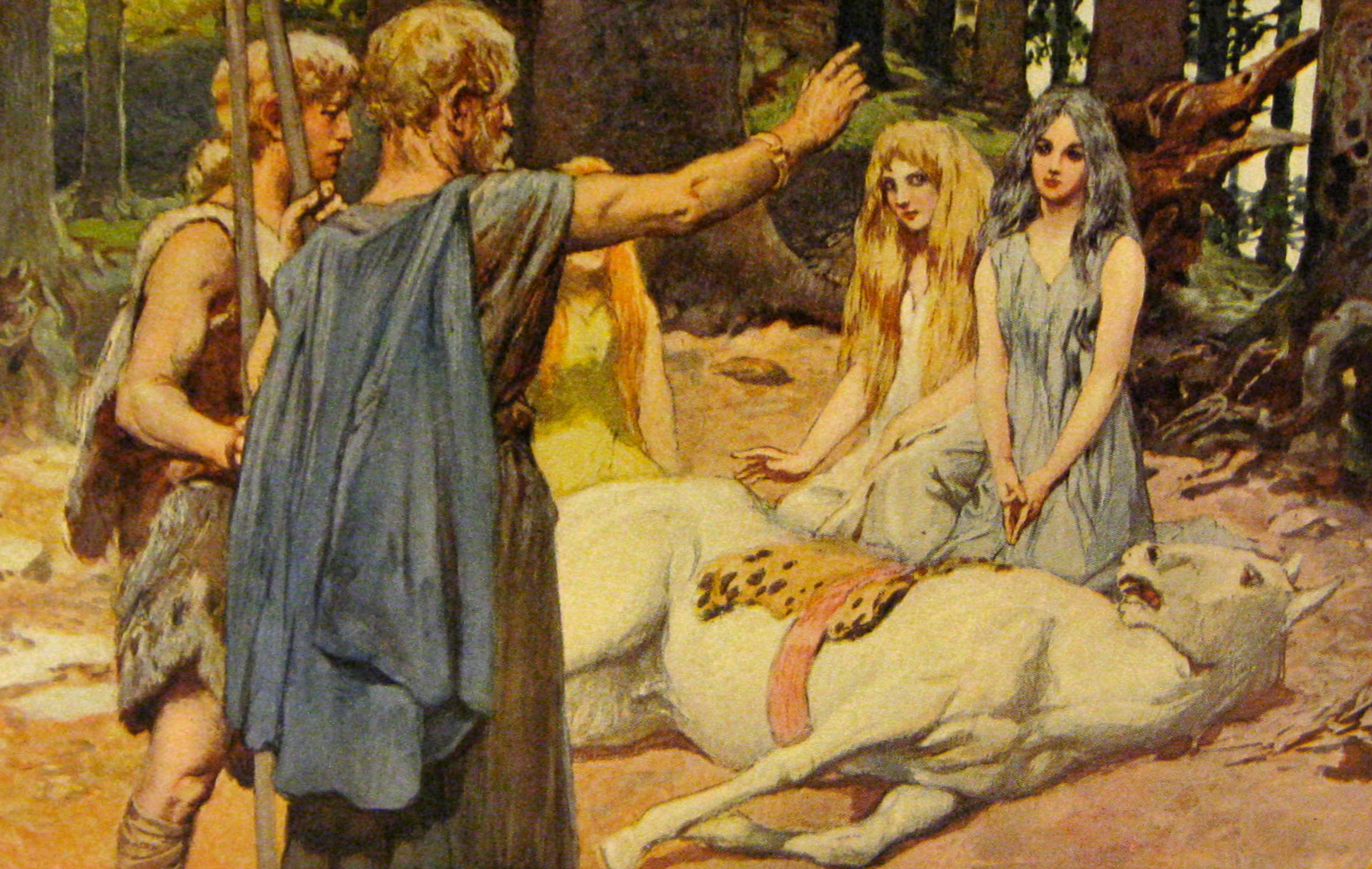
"Wodan Heals Balder's Horse" by Emil Doepler, 1905

A 10th-century manuscript found in what is now Merseburg, Germany, features an invocation known as the Second Merseburg Incantation. The incantation calls upon various continental Germanic gods, including Old High German Frija and a goddess associated with her—Volla, to assist in healing a horse:

Old High German: Phol ende uuodan uuoran zi holza. du uuart demo balderes uolon sin uuoz birenkit. thu biguol en sinthgunt, sunna era suister, thu biguol en friia, uolla era suister thu biguol en uuodan, so he uuola conda: sose benrenki, sose bluotrenki, sose lidirenki: ben zi bena, bluot si bluoda, lid zi geliden, sose gelimida sin!	Bill Griffiths translation: Phol and Woden travelled to the forest. Then was for Baldur's foal its foot wrenched. Then encharmed it Sindgund (and) Sunna her sister, then encharmed it Frija (and) Volla her sister, then encharmed it Woden, as he the best could, As the bone-wrench, so for the blood wrench, (and) so the limb-wrench bone to bone, blood to blood, limb to limb, so be glued.

=== Poetic Edda ===
In the Poetic Edda, compiled during the 13th century from earlier traditional material, Frigg is mentioned in the poems Völuspá, Vafþrúðnismál, the prose of Grímnismál, Lokasenna, and Oddrúnargrátr.

Frigg receives three mentions in the Poetic Edda poem Völuspá. In the first mention the poem recounts that Frigg wept for the death of her son Baldr in Fensalir. Later in the poem, when the future death of Odin is foretold, Odin is referred to as the "beloved of Frigg" and his future death is referred to as the "second grief of Frigg". Like the reference to Frigg weeping in Fensalir earlier in the poem, the implied "first grief" is a reference to the grief she felt upon the death of her son, Baldr.

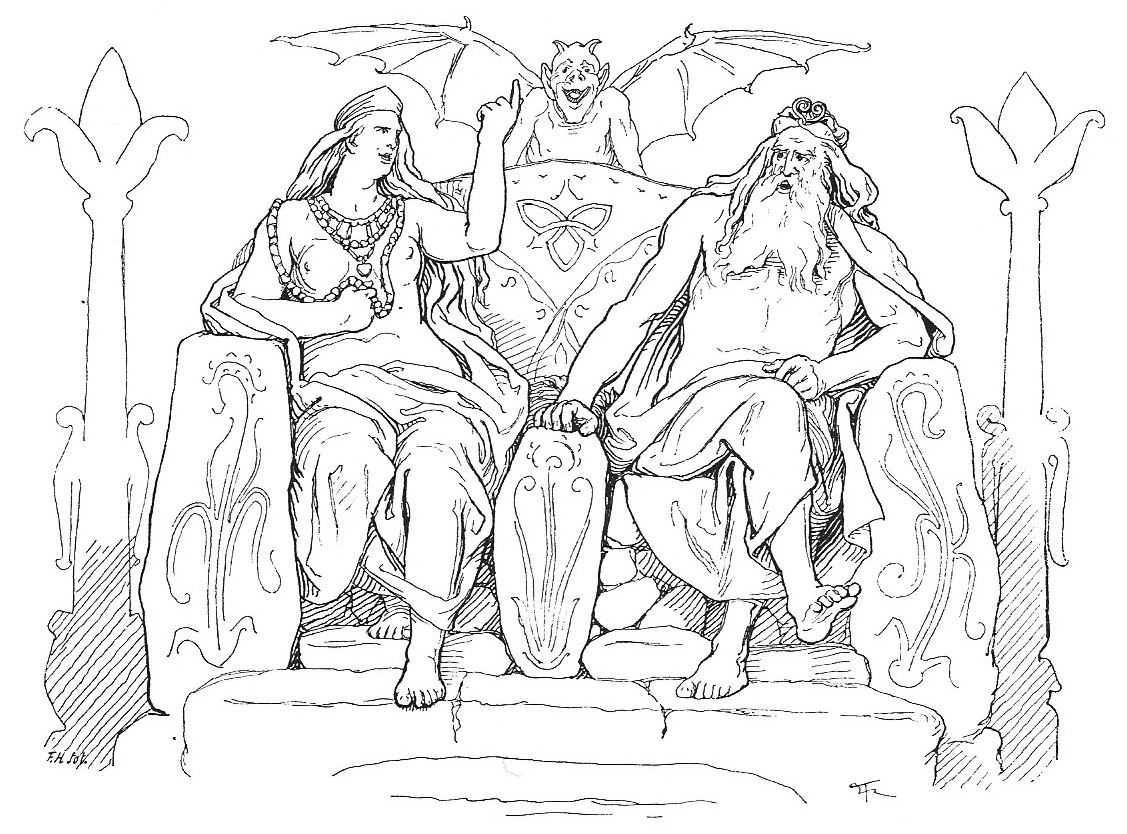
The goddess Frigg and her husband, the god Odin, sit in Hliðskjálf and gaze into "all worlds" and make a wager as described in Grímnismál in an illustration by Lorenz Frølich, 1895

Frigg plays a prominent role in the prose introduction to the poem, Grímnismál. The introduction recounts that two sons of king Hrauðungr, Agnar (age 10) and Geirröðr (age 8), once sailed out with a trailing line to catch small fish, but wind drove them out into the ocean and, during the darkness of night, their boat wrecked. The brothers went ashore, where they met a crofter. They stayed on the croft for one winter, during which the couple separately fostered the two children: the old woman fostered Agnar and the old man fostered Geirröðr. Upon the arrival of spring, the old man brought them a ship. The old couple took the boys to the shore, and the old man took Geirröðr aside and spoke to him. The boys entered the boat and a breeze came.

The boat returned to the harbor of their father. Geirröðr, forward in the ship, jumped to shore and pushed the boat, containing his brother, out and said "go where an evil spirit may get thee." Away went the ship and Geirröðr walked to a house, where he was greeted with joy; while the boys were gone, their father had died, and now Geirröðr was king. He "became a splendid man." The scene switches to Odin and Frigg sitting in Hliðskjálf, "look[ing] into all the worlds." Odin says: "'Seest thou Agnar, thy foster-son, where he is getting children a giantess [Old Norse gȳgi] in a cave? while Geirröd, my foster son, is a king residing in his country.' Frigg answered, 'He is so inhospitable that he tortures his guests, if he thinks that too many come.'"

Odin replied that this was a great untruth and so the two made a wager. Frigg sent her "waiting-maid" Fulla to warn Geirröðr to be wary, lest a wizard who seeks him should harm him, and that he would know this wizard by the refusal of dogs, no matter how ferocious, to attack the stranger. While it was not true that Geirröðr was inhospitable with his guests, Geirröðr did as instructed and had the wizard arrested. Upon being questioned, the wizard, wearing a blue cloak, said no more than that his name is Grímnir. Geirröðr has Grímnir tortured and sits him between two fires for 8 nights. Upon the 9th night, Grímnir is brought a full drinking horn by Geirröðr's son, Agnar (so named after Geirröðr's brother), and the poem continues without further mention or involvement of Frigg.

In the poem Lokasenna, where Loki accuses nearly every female in attendance of promiscuity and/or unfaithfulness, an aggressive exchange occurs between the god Loki and the goddess Frigg (and thereafter between Loki and the goddess Freyja about Frigg). A prose introduction to the poem describes that numerous gods and goddesses attended a banquet held by Ægir. These gods and goddesses include Odin and, "his wife", Frigg.

In the poem Oddrúnargrátr, Oddrún helps Borgny give birth to twins. In thanks, Borgny invokes vættir, Frigg, Freyja, and other unspecified deities.

=== Prose Edda ===
Frigg is mentioned throughout the Prose Edda, compiled in the 13th century by Snorri Sturluson. Frigg is first mentioned in the Prose Edda Prologue, wherein a euhemerized account of the Norse gods is provided. The author describes Frigg as the wife of Odin, and, in a case of folk etymology, the author attempts to associate the name Frigg with the Latin-influenced form Frigida. The Prologue adds that both Frigg and Odin "had the gift of prophecy."

In the next section of the Prose Edda, Gylfaginning, High tells Gangleri (the king Gylfi in disguise) that Frigg, daughter of Fjörgynn (Old Norse Fjörgynsdóttir) is married to Odin and that the Æsir are descended from the couple, and adds that "the earth [Jörðin] was [Odin's] daughter and his wife." According to High, the two had many sons, the first of which was the mighty god Thor.

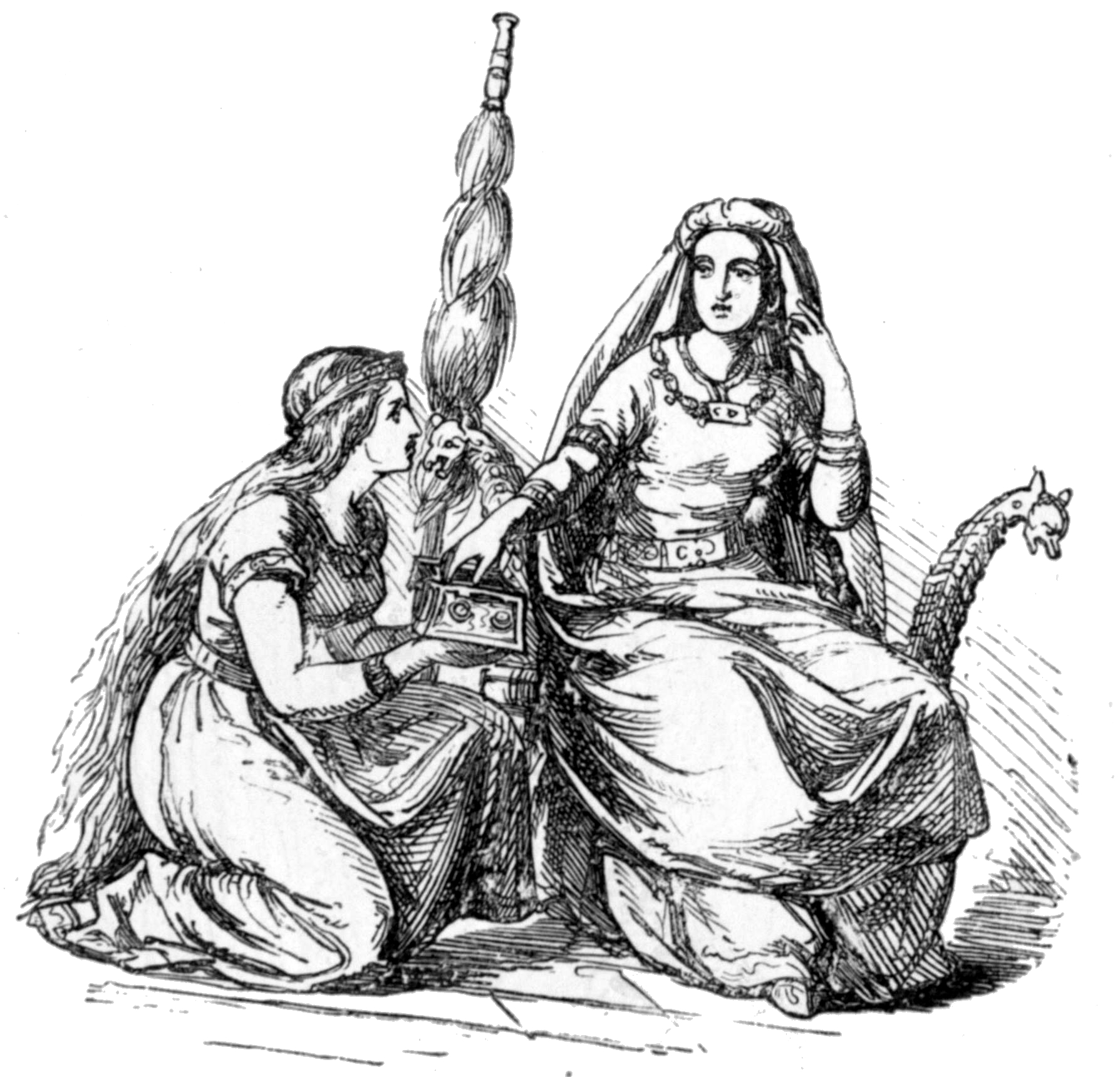
Frigg reaches into a box presented to her by a handmaid, Ludwig Pietsch, 1865

Later in Gylfaginning, Gangleri asks about the ásynjur, a term for Norse goddesses. High says that "highest" among them is Frigg and that only Freyja "is highest in rank next to her." Frigg dwells in Fensalir "and it is very splendid." In this section of Gylfaginning, Frigg is also mentioned in connection to other ásynjur: Fulla carries Frigg's ashen box, "looks after her footwear and shares her secrets;" Lofn is given special permission by Frigg and Odin to "arrange unions" among men and women; Hlín is charged by Frigg to protect those that Frigg deem worthy of keeping from danger; and Gná is sent by Frigg "into various worlds to carry out her business."

In section 49 of Gylfaginning, a narrative about the fate of Frigg's son Baldr is told. According to High, Baldr once started to have dreams indicating that his life was in danger. When Baldr told his fellow Æsir about his dreams, the gods met together for a thing and decided that they should "request immunity for Baldr from all kinds of danger." Frigg subsequently receives promises from the elements, the environment, diseases, animals, and stones, amongst other things. The request successful, the Æsir make sport of Baldr's newfound invincibility; shot or struck, Baldr remained unharmed. However, Loki discovers this and is not pleased by this turn of events, so, in the form of a woman, he goes to Frigg in Fensalir.

There, Frigg asks this female visitor what the Æsir are up to assembled at the thing. The woman says that all of the Æsir are shooting at Baldr and yet he remains unharmed. Frigg explains that "Weapons and wood will not hurt Baldr. I have received oaths from them all." The woman asks Frigg if all things have sworn not to hurt Baldr, to which Frigg notes one exception; "there grows a shoot of a tree to the west of Val-hall. It is called mistletoe. It seemed young to me to demand the oath from." Loki immediately disappears.

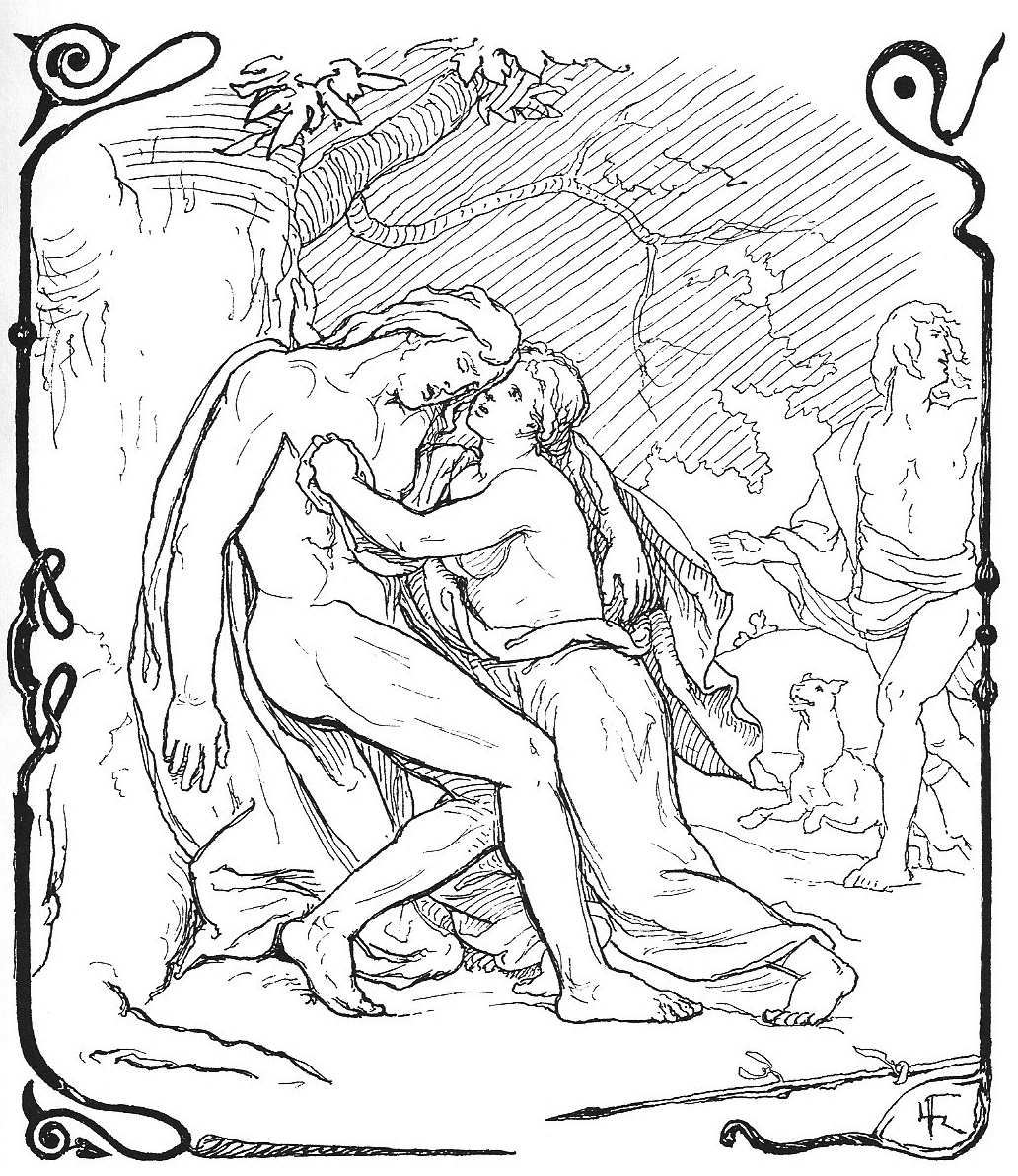
Frigg grips her dead son, Baldr, in an illustration by Lorenz Frølich, 1895

Now armed with mistletoe, Loki arrives at the thing where the Æsir are assembled and tricks the blind Höðr, Baldr's brother, into shooting Baldr with a mistletoe projectile. To the horror of the assembled gods, the mistletoe goes directly through Baldr, killing him. Standing in horror and shock, the gods are initially only able to weep due to their grief. Frigg speaks up and asks "who there was among the Æsir who wished to earn all her love and favour and was willing to ride the road to Hel and try if he could find Baldr, and offer Hel a ransom if she would let Baldr go back to Asgard."

Hermóðr, Baldr's brother, accepts Frigg's request and rides to Hel. Meanwhile, Baldr is given a grand funeral attended by many beings—foremost mentioned of which are his mother and father, Frigg and Odin. During the funeral, Nanna dies of grief and is placed in the funeral pyre with Baldr, her dead husband. Hermóðr locates Baldr and Nanna in Hel. Hermodr secures an agreement for the return of Baldr and with Hermóðr Nanna sends gifts to Frigg (a linen robe) and Fulla (a finger-ring). Hermóðr rides back to the Æsir and tells them what has happened. However, the agreement fails due to the sabotage of a jötunn in a cave named Þökk (Old Norse 'thanks'), described as perhaps Loki in disguise.

Frigg is mentioned several times in the Prose Edda section Skáldskaparmál. The first mention occurs at the beginning of the section, where the Æsir and Ásynjur are said to have once held a banquet in a hall in a land of gods, Asgard. Frigg is one of the twelve ásynjur in attendance.

=== Heimskringla and sagas ===
In Ynglinga saga, the first book of Heimskringla, a Euhemerized account of the origin of the gods is provided. Frigg is mentioned once. According to the saga, while Odin was away, Odin's brothers Vili and Vé oversaw Odin's holdings. Once, while Odin was gone for an extended period, the Æsir concluded that he was not coming back. His brothers started to divvy up Odin's inheritance, "but his wife Frigg they shared between them. However, a short while afterwards, [Odin] returned and took possession of his wife again.

In Völsunga saga, the great king Rerir and his wife (unnamed) are unable to conceive a child; "that lack displeased them both, and they fervently implored the gods that they might have a child. It is said that Frigg heard their prayers and told Odin what they asked."

== Archaeological record ==
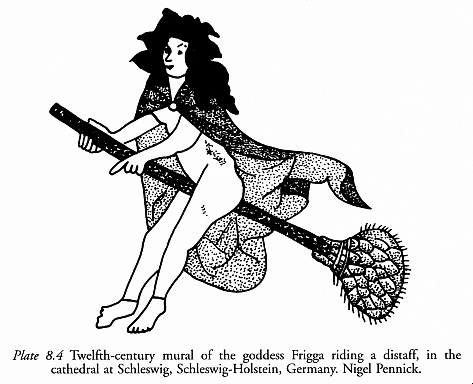
An illustration of what may be Frigg in the Schleswig Cathedral.

A 12th century depiction of a cloaked but otherwise nude woman riding a large cat appears on a wall in the Schleswig Cathedral in Schleswig-Holstein, Northern Germany. Beside her is similarly a cloaked yet otherwise nude woman riding a distaff. Due to iconographic similarities to the literary record, these figures have been theorized as depictions of Freyja and Frigg respectively.

== Scholarly reception and interpretation ==
Due to numerous similarities, some scholars have proposed that the Old Norse goddesses Frigg and Freyja descend from a common entity from the Proto-Germanic period. Regarding a Freyja-Frigg common origin hypothesis, scholar Stephan Grundy comments that "the problem of whether Frigg or Freyja may have been a single goddess originally is a difficult one, made more so by the scantiness of pre-Viking Age references to Germanic goddesses, and the diverse quality of the sources. The best that can be done is to survey the arguments for and against their identity, and to see how well each can be supported."

Unlike Frigg but like the name of the group of gods to which Freyja belongs, the Vanir, the name Freyja is not attested outside of Scandinavia, as opposed to the name of the goddess Frigg, who is attested as a goddess common among the Germanic peoples, and whose name is reconstructed as Proto-Germanic *Frijjō. Similar proof for the existence of a common Germanic goddess from which Freyja descends does not exist, but scholars have commented that this may simply be due to the scarcity of evidence outside of the North Germanic record.

== Modern influence ==
Frigg is referenced in art and literature into the modern period. In the 18th century, Gustav III of Sweden, king of Sweden, composed Friggja, a play, so named after the goddess, and H. F. Block and Hans Friedrich Blunck's Frau Frigg und Doktor Faust in 1937. Richard Wagner included Fricka in his 1870 opera Die Walküre, the second of his Der Ring des Nibelungen cycle, as the goddess wife of Wotan in a key scene for the plot of the whole cycle. Other examples include fine art works by K. Ehrenberg (Frigg, Freyja, drawing, 1883), John Charles Dollman (Frigga Spinning the Clouds, painting, c. 1900), Emil Doepler (Wodan und Frea am Himmelsfenster, painting, 1901), and H. Thoma (Fricka, drawing, date not provided).

== See also ==
- Frigga
- 77 Frigga
