= Merseburg charms =

Medieval spells written in Old High German

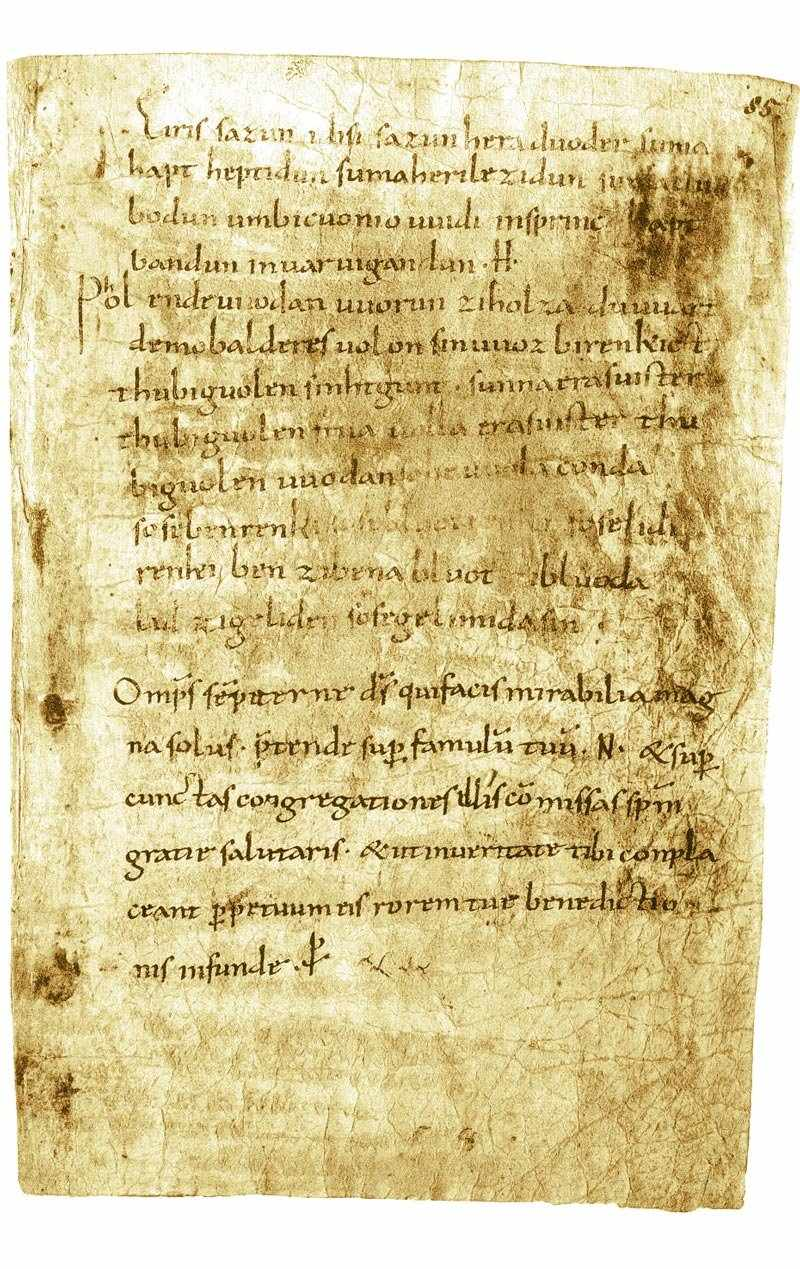
Merseburg Incantations manuscript (Merseburger Domstiftsbibliothek, Codex 136, f. 85r, 10th Cy.)

The Merseburg charms, Merseburg spells, or Merseburg incantations (German: Merseburger Zaubersprüche) are two medieval magic spells, charms or incantations, written in Old High German. They are the only known examples of Germanic pagan belief preserved in the language. They were discovered in 1841 by Georg Waitz, who found them in a theological manuscript from Fulda, written in the 9th century, although there remains some speculation about the date of the charms themselves. The manuscript (Cod. 136 f. 85a) is stored in the library of the cathedral chapter of Merseburg, hence the name. The Merseburg charms have been the subject of notable study since their discovery.

== History ==
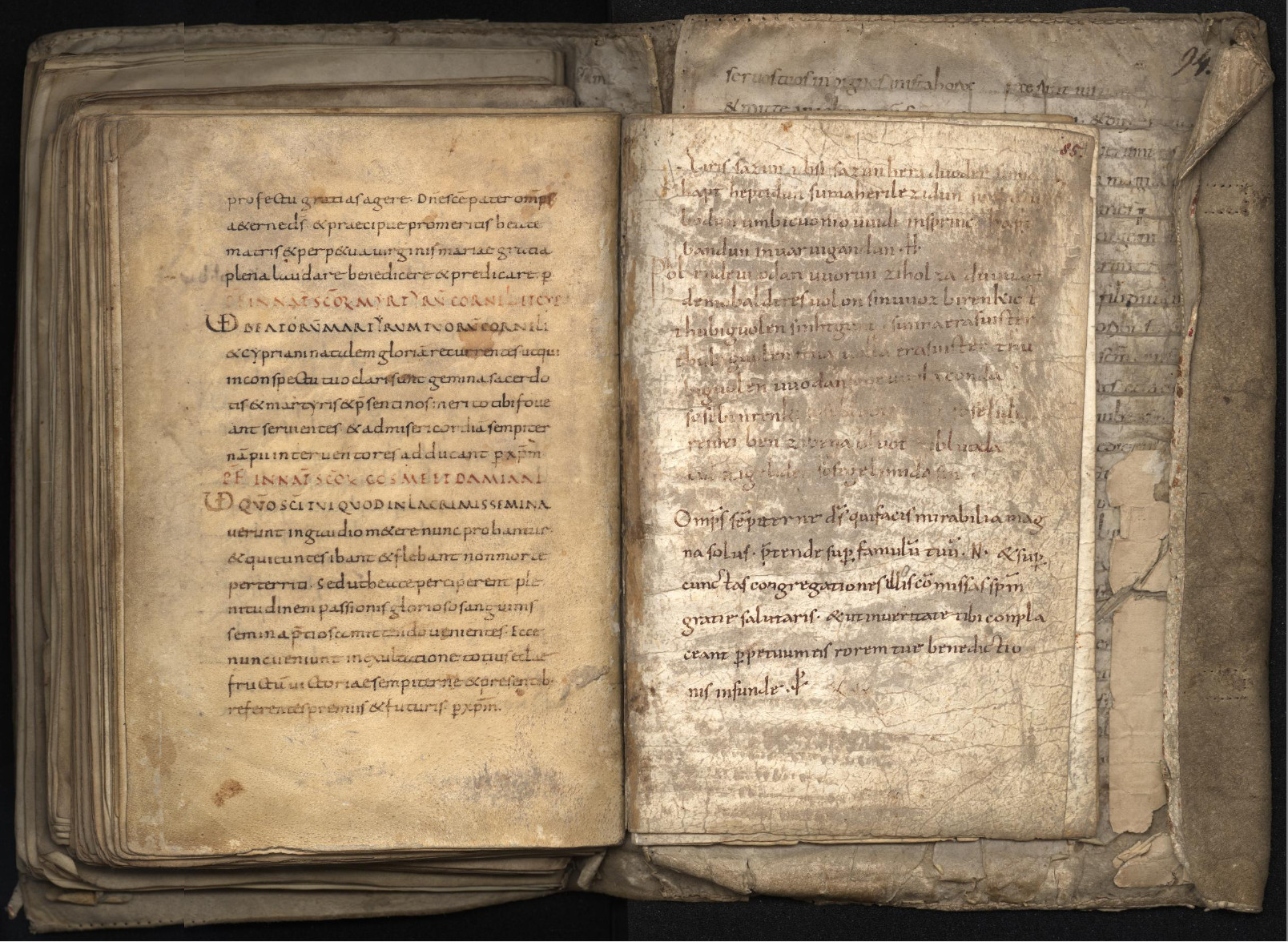
The Merseburg Charms were entered on the flyleaf (here right) of a sacramentary, which was later bound into a miscellany with other manuscripts.

The Merseburg charms are the only known surviving relics of pre-Christian, pagan poetry in Old High German literature.

The charms were recorded in the 10th century by a cleric, possibly in the abbey of Fulda, on a blank page of a liturgical book, which later passed to the library at Merseburg. The charms have thus been transmitted in Caroline minuscule on the flyleaf of a Latin sacramentary.

The spells became famous in modern times through the appreciation of Jacob Grimm, who wrote as follows:

Lying between Leipzig, Halle and Jena, the extensive library of the Cathedral Chapter of Merseburg has often been visited and made use of by scholars. All have passed over a codex which, if they chanced to take it up, appeared to offer only well-known church items, but which now, valued according to its entire content, offers a treasure such that the most famous libraries have nothing to compare with it...

The spells were published later by Jacob Grimm in On two newly-discovered poems from the German Heathen Period (1842).

The manuscript of the Merseburg charms was on display until November 2004 as part of the exhibition "Between Cathedral and World - 1000 years of the Chapter of Merseburg," at Merseburg cathedral. They were previously exhibited in 1939.

== The texts ==
Each charm is divided into two parts: a preamble telling the story of a mythological event; and the actual spell in the form of a magic analogy (just as it was before... so shall it also be now...). In their verse form, the spells are of a transitional type; the lines show not only traditional alliteration but also the end-rhymes introduced in the Christian verse of the 9th century.

=== First Merseburg Charm ===
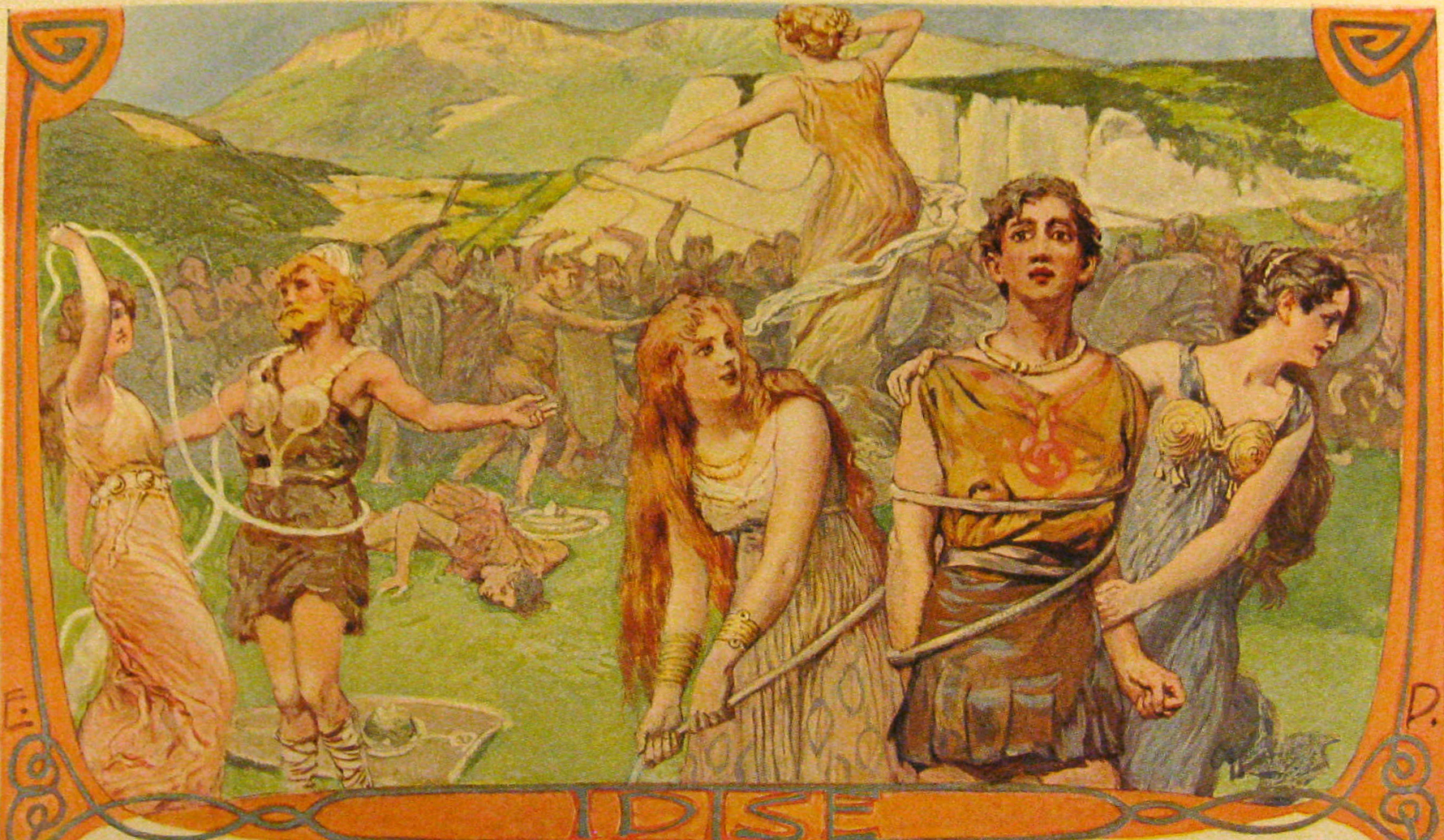
"Idise" (1905) by Emil Doepler

The first spell is a "Lösesegen" (blessing of release), describing how a number of "Idisen" freed from their shackles warriors caught during battle. The last two lines contain the magic words "Leap forth from the fetters, escape from the foes" that are intended to release the warriors.

Eiris sazun idisi,
sazun hera duoder;
suma hapt heptidun,
suma heri lezidun,
suma clubodun
umbi cuoniouuidi:
insprinc haptbandun,
inuar uigandun.

Translation:

Once sat women,
They sat here, then there.
Some fastened bonds,
Some impeded an army,
Some unraveled fetters:

Escape the bonds,
flee the enemy!

=== Second Merseburg Charm ===
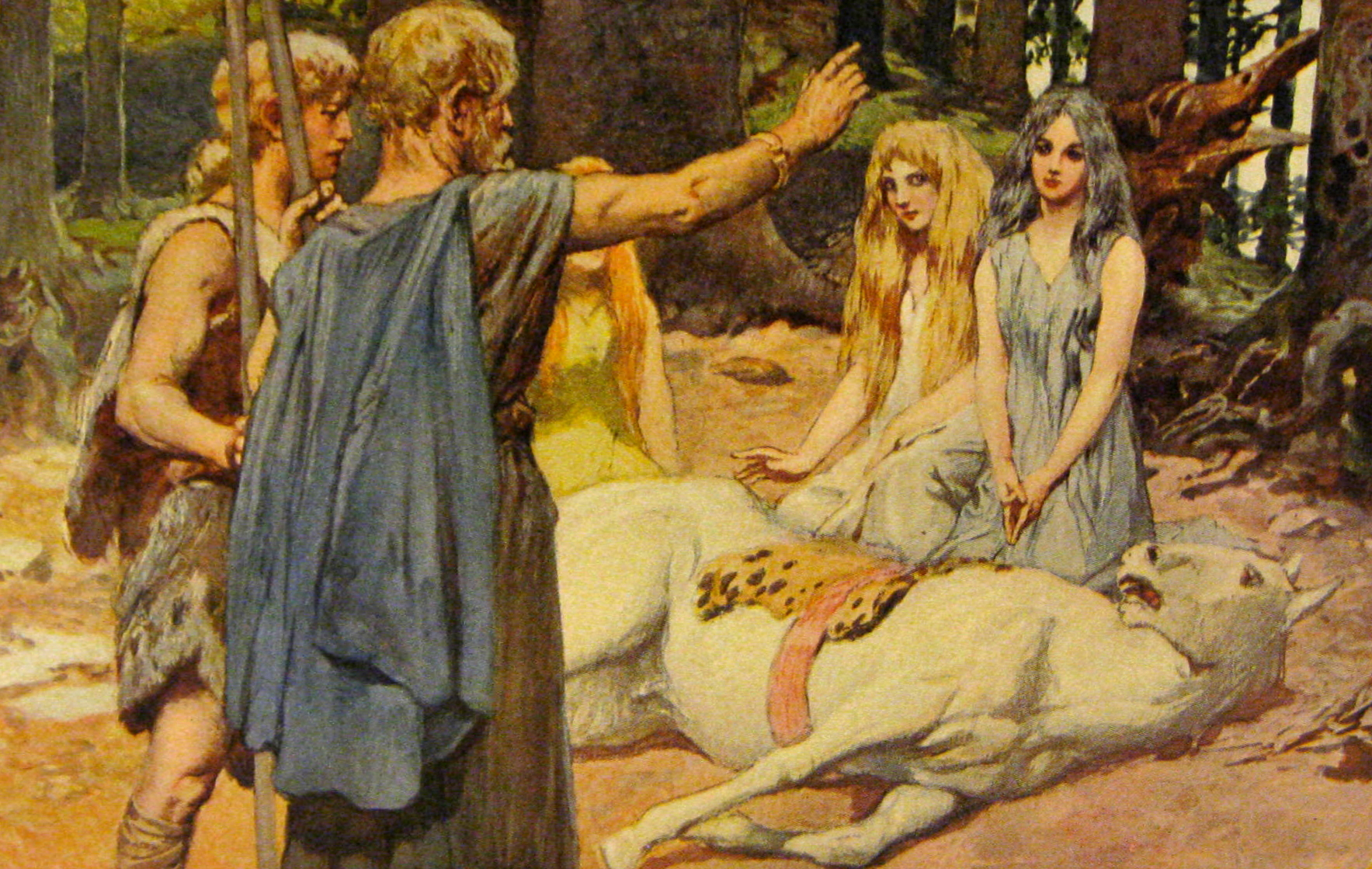
"Wodan Heals Balder's Horse" (1905) by Emil Doepler

Phol is with Wodan when Balder's horse dislocates its foot while he is riding through the forest (holza). Wodan intones the incantation: "Bone to bone, blood to blood, limb to limb, as if they were mended".

Second Merseburg Charm, spoken

Figures that can be clearly identified within Continental Germanic mythology are "Uuôdan" (Wodan) and "Frîia" (Frija). Depictions found on Migration Period Germanic bracteates are often viewed as Wodan (Odin) healing a horse.

Comparing Norse mythology, Wodan is well-attested as the cognate of Odin. Frija is the cognate of Frigg. Balder is Norse Baldr. Phol is possibly the masculine form of Uolla. According to Jacob Grimm, the context would make it clear that it is another name for Balder. The identification with Balder is not conclusive. Modern scholarship suggests that Freyr might be meant. Uolla is cognate with Old Norse Fulla, a goddess there also associated with Frigg. Sunna (the personified sun) is in Norse mythology Sól. Sinthgunt is otherwise unattested.

Phol ende uuodan · uuorun zi holza.
du uuart demo balderes uolon · sin uuoz birenkit.
thu biguol en sinthgunt, · sunna era suister;
thu biguol en friia, · uolla era suister;
thu biguol en uuodan, · so he uuola conda:
sose benrenki, · sose bluotrenki,
sose lidirenki:
ben zi bena, · bluot zi bluoda,
lid zi geliden, · sose gelimida sin

Translation:

Phol and Wodan were riding to the woods,
and the foot of Balder's foal was sprained
So Sinthgunt, Sunna's sister, conjured it;
and Frija, Volla's sister, conjured it;
and Wodan conjured it, as well he could:
Like bone-sprain, so blood-sprain,
so joint-sprain:
Bone to bone, blood to blood,
joints to joints, so may they be glued.

== Parallels ==
The First Merseburg Charm (loosening charm)'s similarity to the anecdote in Bede's Hist. Eccles., IV, 22 has been noted by Jacob Grimm. In this Christianized example, it is the singing of the mass, rather than the chanting of the charm, that effects the release of a comrade (in this case a brother). The unshackled man is asked "whether he had any spells about him, as are spoken of in fabulous stories", which curiously has been translated as "loosening rune (about him)" (Old English: álýsendlícan rune) in the Anglo-Saxon translation of Bede, as has been pointed out by Sophus Bugge. Bugge makes this reference in his edition of the Eddaic poem Grógaldr (1867), in an attempt to justify his emending the phrase "Leifnir's fire (?)" (Old Norse: leifnis elda) into "loosening charm" (Old Norse: leysigaldr) in the context of one of the magic charms that Gróa is teaching to her son. But this is an aggressive emendation of the original text, and its validity as well as any suggestion to its ties to the Merseburg charm is subject to skepticism. (Note: In the original text of Grógaldr, the text that Bugge emended to leysigaldr actually reads leifnis eldr". This is discussed by Rydberg as "Leifner's or Leifin's fire", and connected by him to Dietrich von Bern's fire-breath that can release the heroes from their chains.)

Many analogous magic incantations to the Second Merseburg Charm (horse-healing spell) have been noted. Some paralleling is discernible in other Old German spells, but analogues are particularly abundant in folkloric spells from Scandinavian countries (often preserved in so-called "black books"). Similar charms have been noted in Gaelic, Lettish and Finnish suggesting that the formula is of ancient Indo-European origin. Parallels have also been suggested with Hungarian texts. Some commentators trace the connection back to writings in ancient India.

=== Other Old High German and Old Saxon spells ===
Other spells recorded in Old High German or Old Saxon noted for similarity, such as the group of wurmsegen spells for casting out the nesso (worm) causing the affliction. There are several manuscript recensions of this spell, and Jacob Grimm scrutinizes in particular the so-called Contra vermes variant, in Old Saxon from the Cod. Vindob. theol. 259 (now ÖNB Cod. 751). The title is Latin:

Gang ût, nesso, mit nigun nessiklînon,
ût fana themo margę an that bên, fan themo bêne an that flêsg,
ût fana themo flêsgke an thia hûd, ût fan thera hûd an thesa strâla.
Drohtin, uuerthe so!

— Contra vermes (against worms)

As Grimm explains, the spell tells the nesso worm and its nine young ones to begone, away from the marrow to bone, bone to flesh, flesh to hide (skin), and into the strâla (arrow), which is the implement into which the pest or pathogen is to be coaxed. It closes with the invocation: "Lord (Drohtin), let it be". Grimm insists that this charm is "about lame horses". And the "transitions from marrow to bone (or sinews), to flesh and hide, resemble phrases in the sprain-spells", i.e. the Merseburg horse-charm types.

=== Scandinavia ===
Jacob Grimm in his Deutsche Mythologie, chapter 38, listed examples of what he saw as survivals of the Merseburg charm in popular traditions of his time: from Norway a prayer to Jesus for a horse's leg injury, and two spells from Sweden, one invoking Odin (for a horse suffering from a fit or equine distemper (Note: Fortunately Thorpe (1851), pp. 23–4, vol.1 provides an English translation side by side with the Swedish charm, and clarifies that the condition, in Swedish floget or the 'flog' is "horse distemper". Grimm says it corresponds to German: anflug or a "fit" in English, but it is hard to find any sources precisely defining this.)) and another invoking Frygg for a sheep's ailment. He also quoted one Dutch charm for fixing a horse's foot, and a Scottish one for the treatment of human sprains that was still practiced in his time in the 19th century (See #Scotland below).

==== Norway ====
Grimm provided in his appendix another Norwegian horse spell, which has been translated and examined as a parallel by Thorpe. Grimm had recopied the spell from a tome by Hans Hammond, Nordiska Missions-historie (Copenhagen 1787), pp. 119–120, the spell being transcribed by Thomas von Westen c. 1714. This appears to be the same spell in English as given as a parallel by a modern commentator, though he apparently misattributes it to the 19th century. The texts and translations will be presented side-by-side below:

LII. gegen knochenbruch Jesus reed sig til Heede, der reed han syndt sit Folebeen. Jesus stigede af og lägte det; Jesus lagde Marv i Marv, Ben i Ben, Kjöd i Kjöd; Jesus lagde derpaa et Blad, At det skulde blive i samme stad. i tre navne etc. (Hans Hammond, "Nordiska Missions-historie", Kjøbenhavn 1787, pp.119, 120) (= Bang's formula #6)	--- Jesus rode to the heath, There he rode the leg of his colt in two. Jesus dismounted and heal'd it; Jesus laid marrow to marrow, Bone to bone, flesh to flesh; Jesus laid thereon a leaf, That it might remain in the same place. (Thorpe tr.)	For a Broken Bone Jesus himself rode to the heath, And as he rode, his horse's bone was broken. Jesus dismounted and healed that: Jesus laid marrow to marrow, Bone to bone, flesh to flesh. Jesus thereafter laid a leaf So that these should stay in their place. (Note: Griffiths only vaguely identifies this as a "Norwegian charm, written down in the 19th century", citing Stanley (1975), p. 84 and Stone (1993). The century dating conflicts with Grimm and Bang's attribution.) (in the Three Names, etc.) (Stone(?) tr.)

The number of Norwegian analogues is quite large, though many are just variations on the theme. A similar spell is known to being used by Lisbet Nypan, who was burned as a witch in 1670. Bishop Anton Christian Bang compiled a volume culled from Norwegian black books of charms and other sources, and classified the horse-mending spells under the opening chapter "Odin og Folebenet", strongly suggesting a relationship with the second Merseburg incantation. Bang here gives a group of 34 spells, mostly recorded in the 18th–19th century though two are assigned to the 17th (c. 1668 and 1670), and 31 of the charms are for treating horses with an injured leg. The name for the horse's trauma, which occurs in the titles, is Norwegian: vred in most of the rhymes, with smatterings of raina and bridge (sic.), but they all are essentially synonymous with brigde, glossed as the "dislocation of the limb" (Note: brigde Danish: Forvridning af Lemmer (dislocation of the limbs).) in Aasen's dictionary.

From Bishop Bang's collection, the following is a list of specific formulas discussed as parallels in scholarly literature:

- No. 2, "Jesus og St. Peter over Bjergene red.." (c. 1668. From Lister og Mandal Amt, or the modern-day Vest-Agder. Ms. preserved at the Danish Rigsarkivet)
- No. 6, Jesus red sig tile Hede.." (c. 1714. Veø, Romsdal). Same as Grimm's LII quoted above.
- No, 20, "Jeus rei sin Faale over en Bru.." (c. 1830. Skåbu, Oppland. However Wadstein's paper does not focus the study on the base text version, but the variant Ms. B which has the "Faale" spelling)
- No. 22, "Vor Herre rei.." (c. 1847. Valle, Sætersdal. Recorded by Jørgen Moe) (Note: No. 7 and a text similar to No. 21 are used as parallels in the Norwegian Wikipedia article, no:Merseburgerformelen.)

It might be pointed out that none of the charms in Bang's chapter "Odin og Folebenet" actually invokes Odin. (Note: Although a couple of charms (No. 40, No. 127) among some 1550 in Bang's volume do name the pagan god.) The idea that the charms have been Christianized and that the presence of Baldur has been substituted by "The Lord" or Jesus is expressed by Bang in another treatise, crediting communications with Bugge and the work of Grimm in the matter. Jacob Grimm had already pointed out the Christ-Balder identification in interpreting the Merseburg charm; Grimm seized on the idea that in the Norse language, "White Christ (hvíta Kristr)" was a common epithet, just as Balder was known as the "white Æsir-god"

Another strikingly similar "horse cure" incantation is a 20th-century sample that hails the name of the ancient 11th-century Norwegian king Olaf II of Norway. The specimen was collected in Møre, Norway, where it was presented as for use in healing a bone fracture:

Les denne bøna

Sankt-Olav reid i den
grøne skog,
fekk skade på sin
eigen hestefot.
Bein i bein,
kjøt i kjøt,
hud i hud.
Alt med Guds ord og amen

Translation:
To Heal a Bone Fracture

Saint Olav rode in
green wood;
broke his little
horse's foot.
Bone to bone,
flesh to flesh,
skin to skin.
In the name of God,
amen.

This example too has been commented as corresponding to the second Merseburg Charm, with Othin being replaced by Saint Olav.

==== Sweden ====
Several Swedish analogues were given by Sophus Bugge and by Viktor Rydberg in writings published around the same time (1889). The following 17th-century spell was noted as a parallel to the Merseburg horse charm by both of them:

Mot vred
(Sörbygdens dombok, 1672)

Vår herre Jesus Kristus och S. Peder de gingo eller rede öfver Brattebro. S. Peders häst fick vre eller skre. Vår herre steg af sin häst med, signa S. Peders häst vre eller skre: blod vid blod, led vid led. Så fick S. Peders häst bot i 3 name o.s.v.

— Bugge and Rydberg, after Arcadius (1883)
Translation:
Against dislocations
(court proceeding records for Sörbygden hundred, 1672)

Our Lord Jesus Christ and St. Peter went or rode over Brattebro. St. Peter's horse got (a dislocation or sprain). Our Lord dismounted from His horse, blessed St. Peter's horse (with the dislocation or sprain): blood to blood, (joint to joint). So received St. Peter's horse healing in three names etc. etc.

— adapted from Eng. tr. in: Nicolson 1892, Myth and Religion, p.120– and Brenner's German tr. of Bugge (1889) (Note: Nicolson gives "St. Peter's horse got vre eller skre the italics he footnotes as meaning "mishandled or slipped". He also translated led vid led as "sinew to sinew", but Brenner has Glied (joint))

Another example (from Kungelf's Dombok, 1629) was originally printed by Arcadius:

Vår herre red ad hallen ned. Hans foles fod vrednede ved, han stig aff, lagde leed ved leed, blod ved blod, kiöd ved kiöd, ben ved ben, som vor herre signet folen sin, leedt ind igjen, i naffn, o.s.v.

— Rydberg, after Arcadius, (1883) ?
Translation:

Our Lord rode down to the hall. His foal's foot became sprained, he dismounted, laid joint with joint, blood with blood, sinew with sinew, bone with bone, as our Lord blessed his foal, led in again, in the name of, etc.

A spell beginning "S(anc)te Pär och wår Herre de wandrade på en wäg" (from Sunnerbo hundred, Småland 1746) was given originally by Johan Nordlander.

A very salient example (from Jellundtofte socken, Västbo hundred in Småland), though contemporary to Bugge's time, is a Sign of the Cross incantation (Danish: signeformularer) that invokes Odin's name:

Oden rider öfver sten och bärg
han rider sin häst ur vred och i led,
ur olag och i lag, ben till ben, led till led,
som det bäst var, när det helt var.

— Recorded by Artur Hazelius, communicated to Bugge.
Translation:

Odin rides over rock and hill;
he rides his horse out of dislocation and into realignment
out of disorder and into order, bone to bone, joint to joint,
as it was best, when it was whole.

==== Denmark ====
A Danish parallel noted by A. Kuhn is the following:

Imod Forvridning (Jylland)

Jesus op ad Bierget red;
der vred han sin Fod af Led.
Saa satte han sig ned at signe.
Saa sagde han:
Jeg signer Sener i Sener,
Aarer i Aarer,
Kiød i Kiød,
Og Blod i Blod!
Saa satte han Haanden til Jorden ned,
Saa lægedes hans Fodeled!
I Navnet o.s.v.

— Thiele's #530
Translation:
against dislocations (from Jutland)

Jesus up the mountain did ride;
sprained his foot in the joint.
He sat down for a blessing,
and so said he:
I bless tendon to tendon
vein to vein,
flesh to flesh,
and blood to blood!
So he set his hand down on the ground below,
and bonded were his joints together!
In the Name, etc. (Note: Wikiuser translated.)

=== Scotland ===
Grimm also exemplified a Scottish charm (for people, not horses) as a salient remnant of the Merseburg type of charm. This healing spell for humans was practiced in Shetland (which has strong Scandinavian ties and where the Norn language used to be spoken). The practice involved tying a "wresting thread" of black wool with nine knots around the sprained leg of a person, and in an inaudible voice pronouncing the following:

The Lord rade and the foal slade;
he lighted and he righted,
set joint to joint,
bone to bone,
and sinew to sinew
Heal in the Holy Ghost's name!

Alexander Macbain (who also supplies a presumably reconstructed Gaelic "Chaidh Criosd a mach/Air maduinn mhoich" to the first couplet of "The Lord rade" charm above) also records a version of a horse spell which was chanted while "at the same time tying a worsted thread on the injured limb".

Chaidh Criosda mach
Sa' mhaduinn mhoich
'S fhuair e casan nan each,
Air am bristeadh mu seach.
Chuir e cnaimh ri cnaimh,
Agus feith ri feith,
Agus feòil ri feòil,
Agus craicionn ri craicionn,
'S mar leighis esan sin
Gu'n leighis mise so.

— (a version of the Eolas from Lochbroom)
Translation:

Christ went forth
In the early morn
And found the horses' legs
Broken across.
He put bone to bone.
Sinew to sinew,
Flesh to flesh.
And skin to skin;
And as He healed that,
May I heal this.

— (Macbain tr.)

Macbain goes on to quote another Gaelic horse spell, one beginning "Chaidh Brìde mach..." from Cuairtear nan Gleann (July 1842) that invokes St. Bride as a "he" rather than "she", plus additional examples suffering from corrupted text.

=== Ancient India ===
There have been repeated suggestions that healing formula of the Second Merseburg Charm may well have deep Indo-European roots. A parallel has been drawn between this charm and an example in Vedic literature, an incantation from the 2nd millennium BCE found in the Atharvaveda, hymn IV, 12:

1. róhaṇy asi róhany asthṇaç chinnásya róhaṇî róháye 'dám arundhati
2. yát te rishṭáṃ yát te dyuttám ásti péshṭraṃ te âtmáni dhâtấ tád bhadráyâ púnaḥ sáṃ dadhat párushâ páruḥ
3. sáṃ te majjấ majjñấ bhavatu sámu te párushâ páruḥ sáṃ te mâmsásya vísrastaṃ sáṃ ásthy ápi rohatu
4. majjấ majjñấ sáṃ dhîyatâṃ cármaṇâ cárma rohatu ásṛk te ásthi rohatu ṃâṇsáṃ mâṇséna rohatu
5. lóma lómnâ sáṃ kalpayâ tvacấ sáṃ kalpayâ tvácam ásṛk te ásthi rohatu chinnáṃ sáṃ dhehy oshadhe

Translation:

1. Grower (Rohani) (Note: Skr. Rohani (Sanskrit: रोहणी) "grower", another name for the medicine plant arundhati mentioned in this strophe. Lincoln (1986), p. 104) art thou, grower, grower of severed bone; make this grow. O arundhatī (Note: Here a climbing vine; cf. Arundhati)
2. What of thee is torn, what of thee is inflamed (?), what of thee is crushed (?) in thyself may Dhātar (Note: The Creator.) excellently put that together again, joint with joint.
3. Let thy marrow come together with marrow, and thy joint together with joint; together let what of your flesh has fallen apart, together let thy bone grow over.
4. Let marrow be put together with marrow; let skin grow with skin; let thy blood, bone grow; let flesh grow with flesh.
5. Fit thou together hair with hair; fit together skin with skin; let thy blood, bone grow; put together what is severed, O herb..., etc.

This parallelism was first observed by Adalbert Kuhn, who attributed it to a common Indo-European origin. This idea of an origin from a common prototype is accepted by most scholars, although some have argued that these similarities are accidental.

The Rohani (Rōhaṇī Sanskrit: रोहणी) here apparently does not signify a deity, but rather a healing herb; in fact, just an alternative name for the herb arundathi mentioned in the same strain.

== See also ==
- Eggja stone
- Lorsch Bee Blessing
- Nine Herbs Charm
- High Medieval Norwegian Rune Charms
