= Sól (Germanic mythology) =

Germanic deity

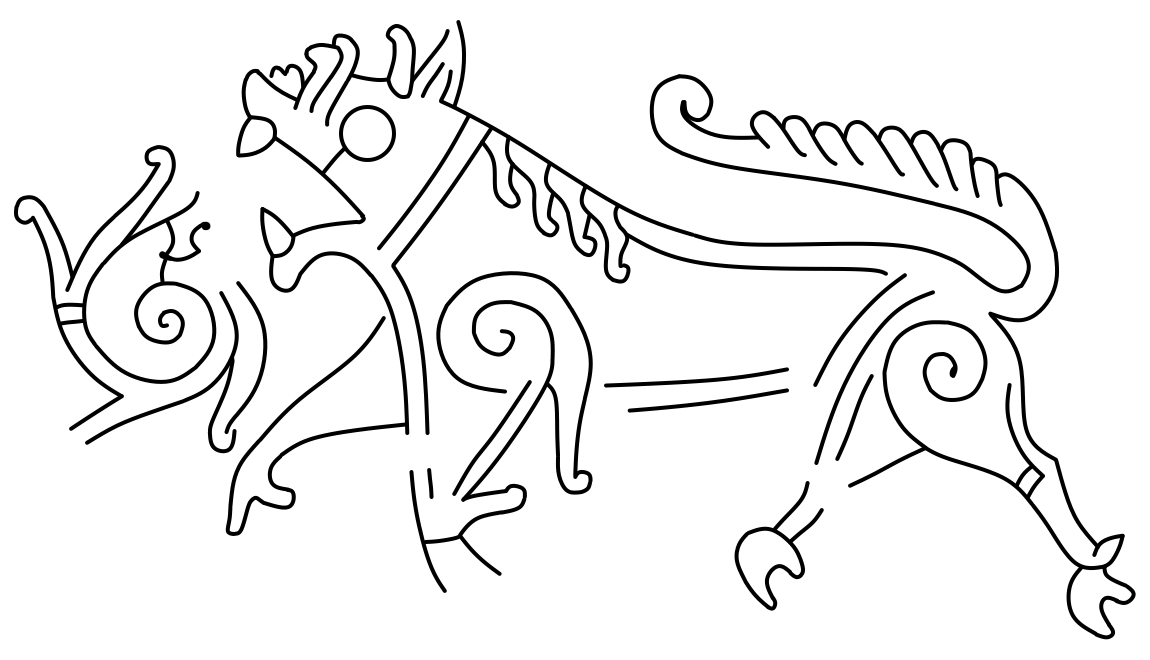
Motif on the Vang stone (11th century), probably depicting Sköll or Fenrir trying to eat the Sun

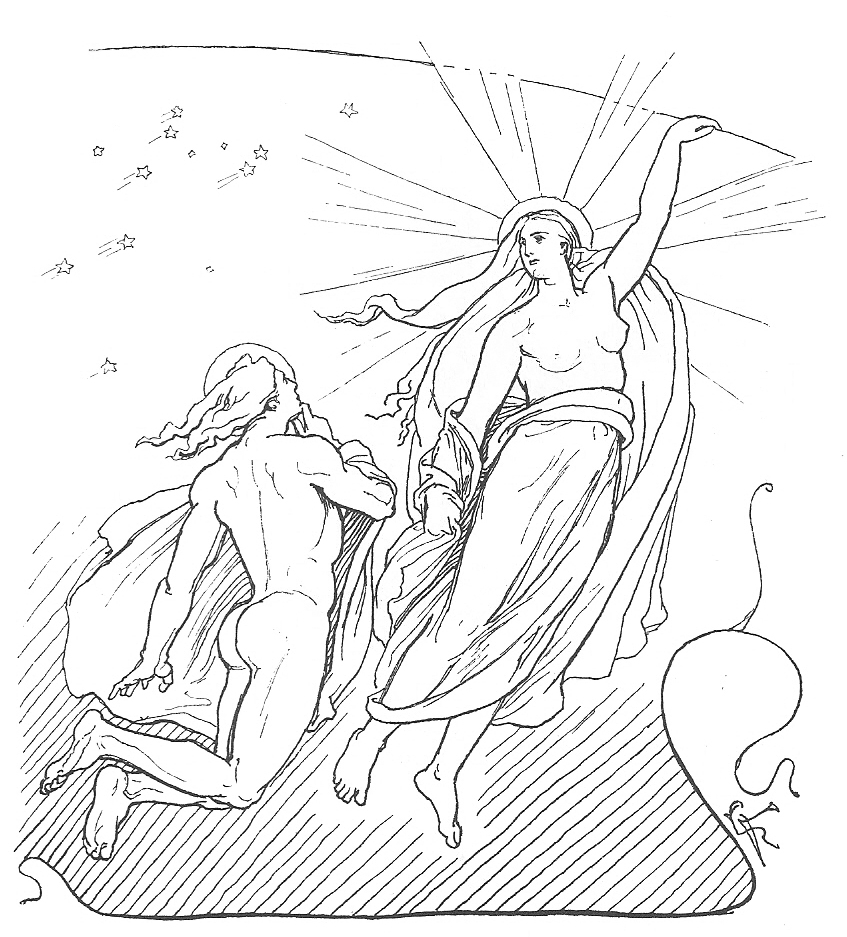
Depiction of Máni and Sól (1895) by Lorenz Frølich

In Germanic mythology, Sól (Old Norse: [ˈsoːl]) or Sunna (Old High German, and existing as an Old Norse and Icelandic synonym: see Wiktionary sunna), Old English: Siġel, Sunne; Old Frisian: Sunne, Old Saxon: Sunna, Old High German: Sunna, Gothic: 𐍃𐌿𐌽𐌽𐍉, romanized: Sunnō) is the Sun personified as a goddess. In Norse mythology, she travels across the sky in a horse-drawn wagon, a motif dating to the Nordic Bronze Age, as depicted on the Trundholm sun chariot, and is sometimes referred to Álfröðull.

One of the two Old High German Merseburg Incantations, written in the 9th or 10th century CE, refers to Sunna as the sister of Sinthgunt. Sól is attested as one of the Æsir in the Poetic Edda, compiled in the 13th century from earlier traditional sources, and the Prose Edda, written in the 13th century by Snorri Sturluson. Both describe her as the sister of the personified moon, Máni, and the daughter of Mundilfari, and foretell that she will be killed by a monstrous wolf during the events of Ragnarök, although she will have previously given birth to a daughter who will continue her mother's course through the heavens. In the Prose Edda, she is additionally described as the wife of Glenr. As a proper noun, Sól appears throughout Old Norse literature. Scholars have produced theories about the development of the goddess from potential Nordic Bronze Age and Proto-Indo-European roots.

== West Germanic attestations ==
=== Merseburg Incantations ===
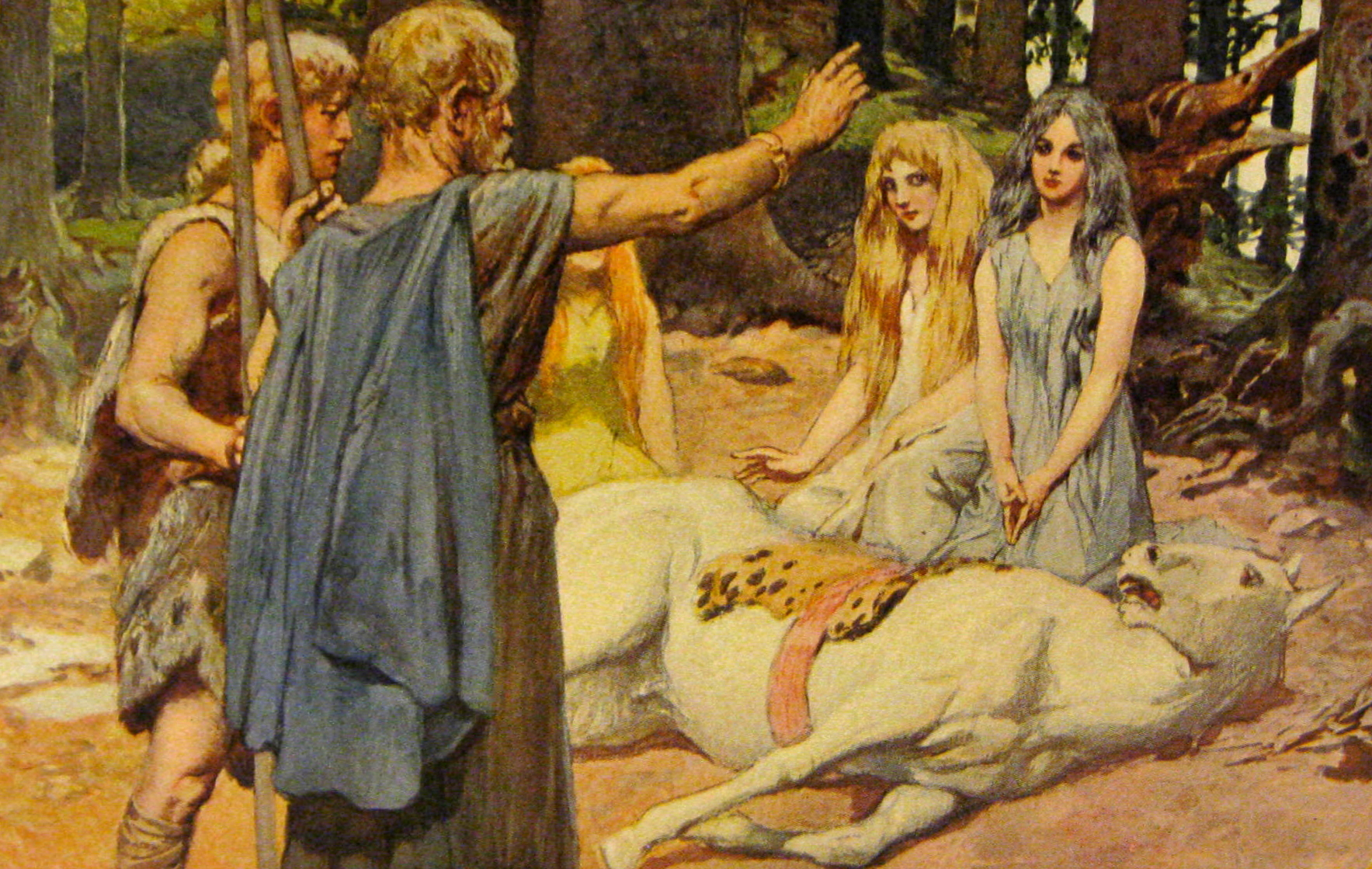
Wodan Heals Balder's Horse (1905) by Emil Doepler

One of the two Old High German Merseburg Incantations, dated to the 9th or 10th century, mentions Sunna, who is described as having a sister, Sinthgunt. The incantation describes how Phol and Wodan rode to a wood, and there Balder's foal sprained its foot. Sinthgunt sang charms, her sister Sunna sang charms, Friia sang charms, her sister Volla sang charms, and finally Wodan sang charms, followed by a verse describing the healing of the foal's bone.

== Norse attestations ==
=== Poetic Edda ===
In the poem Völuspá, a dead völva recounts the history of the universe and foretells the future to the disguised god Odin. In doing so, the völva recounts the early days of the universe, in which:

Benjamin Thorpe translation:

The sun from the south, the moon's companion,
her right hand cast about the heavenly horses.
The sun knew not where she a dwelling had,
the moon know not what power he possessed,
the stars knew not where they had a station.

Henry Adams Bellows translation:

The sun, the sister of the moon, from the south
Her right hand cast over heaven's rim;
No knowledge she had where her home should be,
The moon knew not what might was his,
The stars knew not where their stations were.

In the poem Vafþrúðnismál, the god Odin tasks the jötunn Vafþrúðnir with a question about the origins of the sun and the moon. Vafþrúðnir responds that Mundilfari is the father of both Sól and Máni, and that they must pass through the heavens every day to count the years for man:

Mundilfæri hight he, who the moon's father is, and eke the sun's; round heaven journey each day they must, to count years for men.	"Mundilferi is he who began the moon, And fathered the flaming sun; The round of heaven each day they run, To tell the time for men."

Also in Vafþrúðnismál, Odin asks Vafþrúðnir where another sun will come from once Fenrir has assailed the current sun. Vafþrúðnir responds that before Álfröðull (Sól) is assailed by Fenrir, she will bear a daughter who will ride on her mother's paths after the events of Ragnarök.

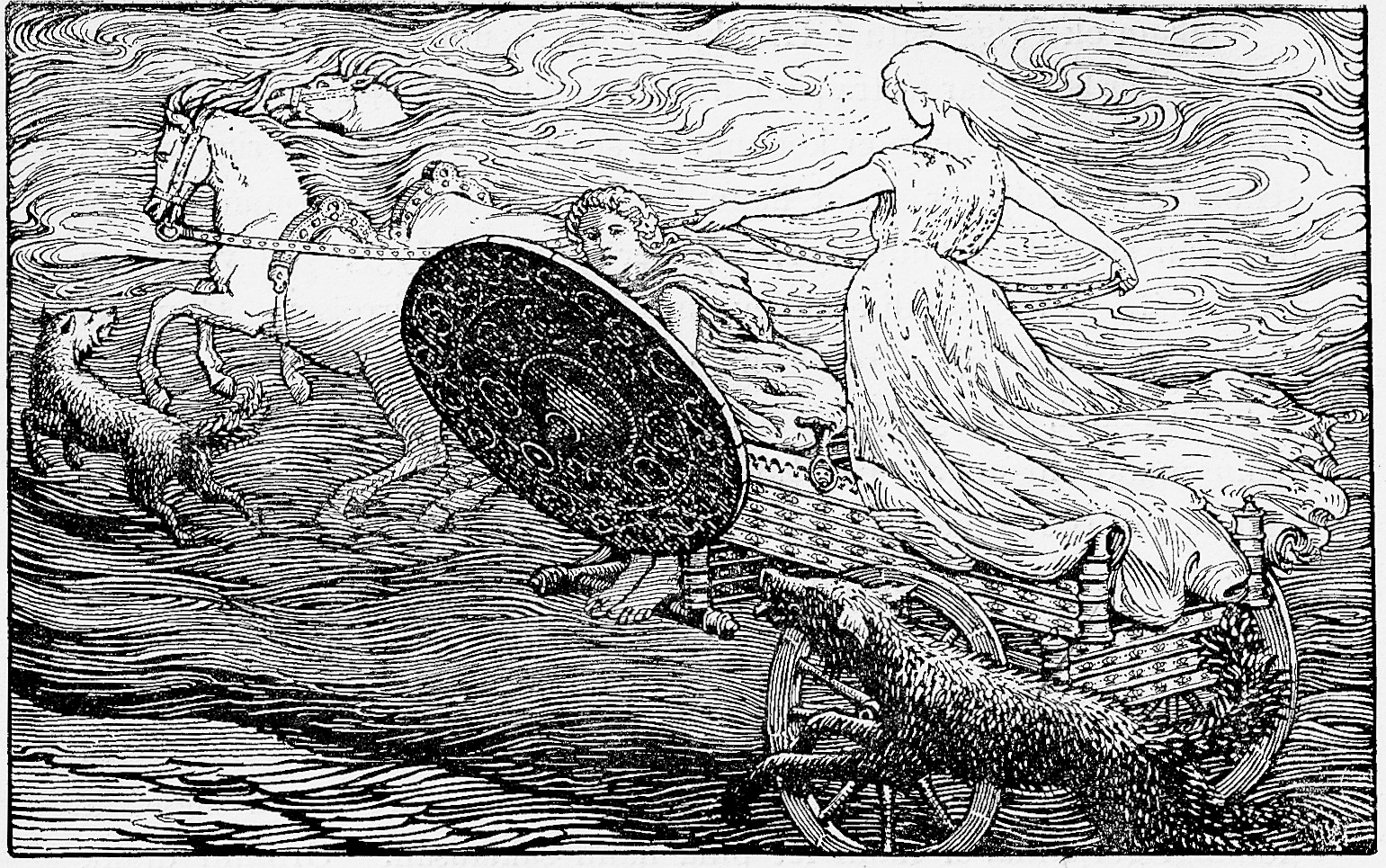
The Chariot of the Sun by W. G. Collingwood

In a stanza of the poem Grímnismál, Odin says that before the sun (referred to as "the shining god") is a shield named Svalinn, and if the shield were to fall from its frontal position, mountain and sea "would burn up". In stanza 39 Odin (disguised as Grimnir) says that both the Sun and the Moon are pursued through the heavens by wolves; the Sun, referred to as the "bright bride" of the heavens, is pursued by Sköll, while the Moon is pursued by Hati Hróðvitnisson.

In the poem Alvíssmál, the god Thor questions the dwarf Alvíss about the Sun, asking him what the Sun is called in each of the worlds. Alvíss responds that it is called sól by mankind, sunna by the gods, Dvalins leika ('Dvalinn's deluder') by the dwarfs, eygló ('everglow') by the jötnar, fagrahvél ('lovely wheel') by the elves, and alskír ('all-shining') by the "sons of the Æsir".

=== Prose Edda ===
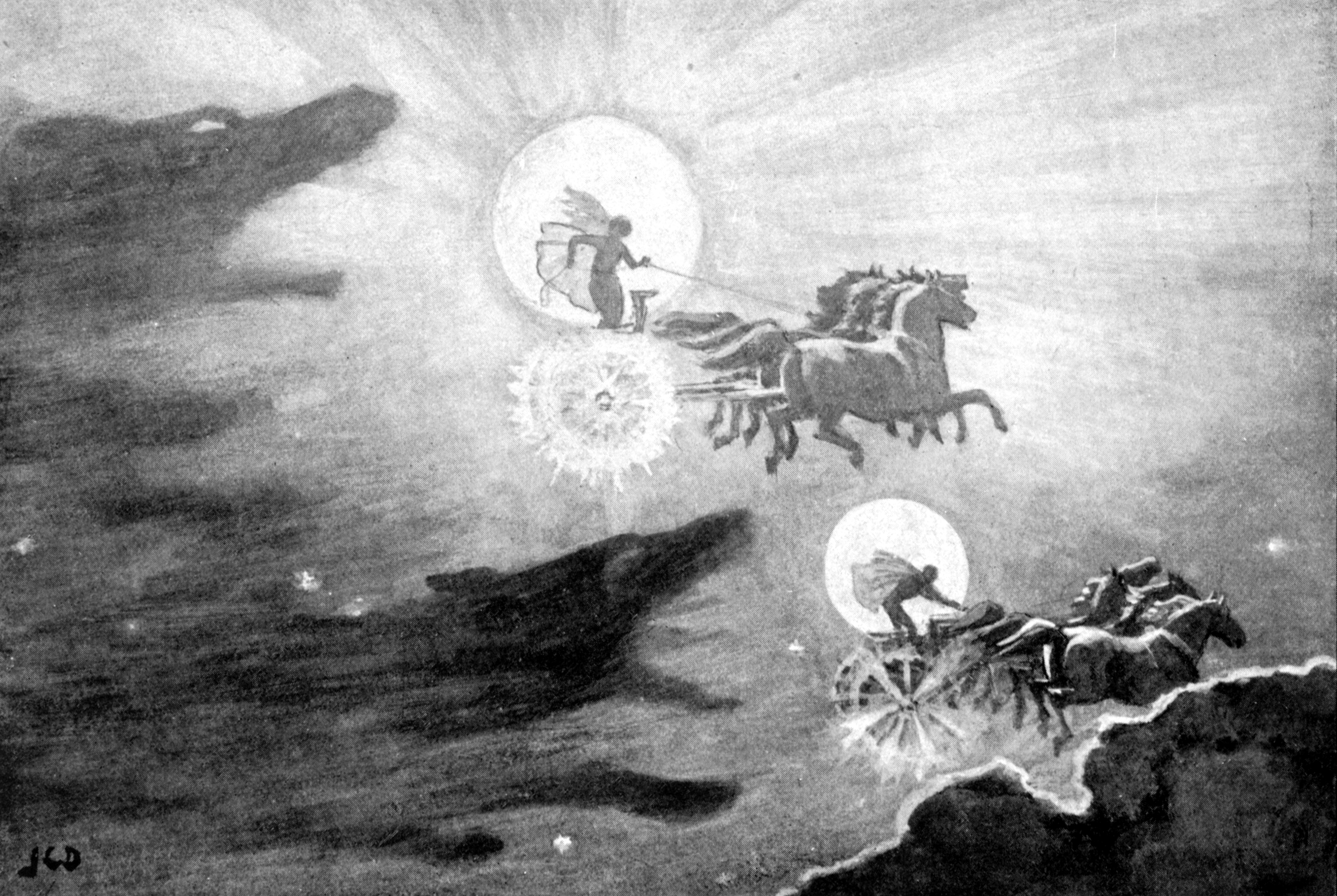
The Wolves Pursuing Sol and Mani (1909) by J. C. Dollman.

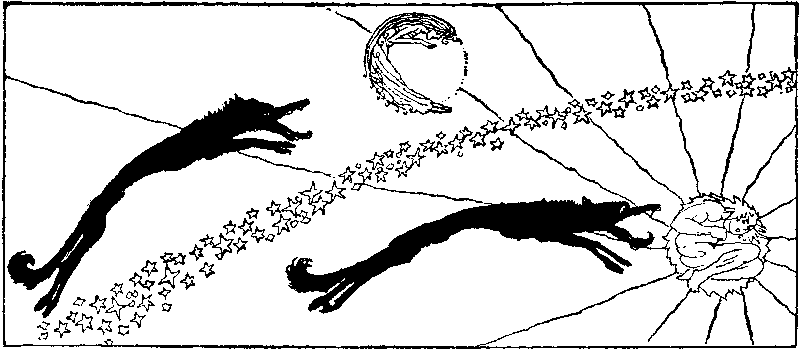
Far away and long ago (1920) by Willy Pogany.

Sól is referenced in the Prose Edda book Gylfaginning, where she is introduced in chapter 8 in a quote from stanza 5 of Völuspá. In chapter 11 of Gylfaginning, Gangleri (described as King Gylfi in disguise) asks the enthroned figure of High how the Sun and Moon are steered. High describes that Sól is one of the two children of Mundilfari, and states that the children were so beautiful they were named after the Sun (Sól) and the Moon (Máni). Mundilfari has Sól married to a man named Glenr.

High says that the gods were "angered by this arrogance" and that the gods had the two placed in the heavens. There, the children were made to drive the horses Árvakr and Alsviðr that drew the chariot of the sun. High says that the gods had created the chariot to illuminate the worlds from burning embers flying from the fiery world of Muspelheim. In order to cool the horses, the gods placed two bellows beneath their shoulders, and that "according to the same lore" these bellows are called Ísarnkol.

In chapter 12 of Gylfaginning, Gangleri tells High that the sun moves quickly, almost as if she were moving so quickly that she fears something, that she could not go faster even if she were afraid of her own death. High responds that "It is not surprising that she moves with such speed. The one chasing her comes close, and there is no escape for her except to run." Gangleri asks who chases her, to which High responds that two wolves give chase to Sól and Máni. The first wolf, Sköll, chases Sól, and despite her fear, Sköll will eventually catch her. Hati Hróðvitnisson, the second wolf, runs ahead of Sól to chase after Máni, whom Hati Hróðvitnisson will also catch. In chapter 35, Sól's status as a goddess is stated by High, along with Bil.

In chapter 53, High says that after the events of Ragnarök, Sól's legacy will be continued by a daughter that is no less beautiful than she, who will follow the path she once rode, and, in support, Vafþrúðnismál stanza 47 is then quoted.

In the Prose Edda book Skáldskaparmál, Sól is first presented in chapter 93, where the kennings "daughter of Mundilfæri", "sister of Máni", "wife of Glen", "fire of sky and air" are given for her, followed by an excerpt of a work by the 11th century skald Skúli Þórsteinsson:

God-blithe bedfellow of Glen
steps to her divine sanctuary
with brightness; then descends the good
light of grey-clad moon.

In chapter 56, additional names for Sól are given; "day-star", "disc", "ever-glow", "all-bright seen", "fair-wheel", "grace-shine", "Dvalinn's toy", "elf-disc", "doubt-disc", and "ruddy". In chapter 58, following a list of horses, the horses Arvakr and Alsviðr are listed as drawing the sun, and, in chapter 75, Sól is again included in a list of goddesses.

=== Rune poems ===
The Norse name for the s-rune ᛋ was "Sun" (Old Norse: Sól), referencing either the mythological goddess or the sun itself. The goddess is hinted at in the common Icelandic rune poem, as well as some Icelandic kennings published by Olaus Verelius in 1675.

Old West Norse (normalized)
English translation

Sól er skýja skjǫldr
ok skínandi rǫðull
ok ísa aldrtregi

Sun is the shield of the skies
and shining halo
and destroyer of ice

Sól skýja skjǫldr
skínandi rǫðull
hverfandi hvel

Sun skies' shield
shining halo
revolving wheel

== Theories ==
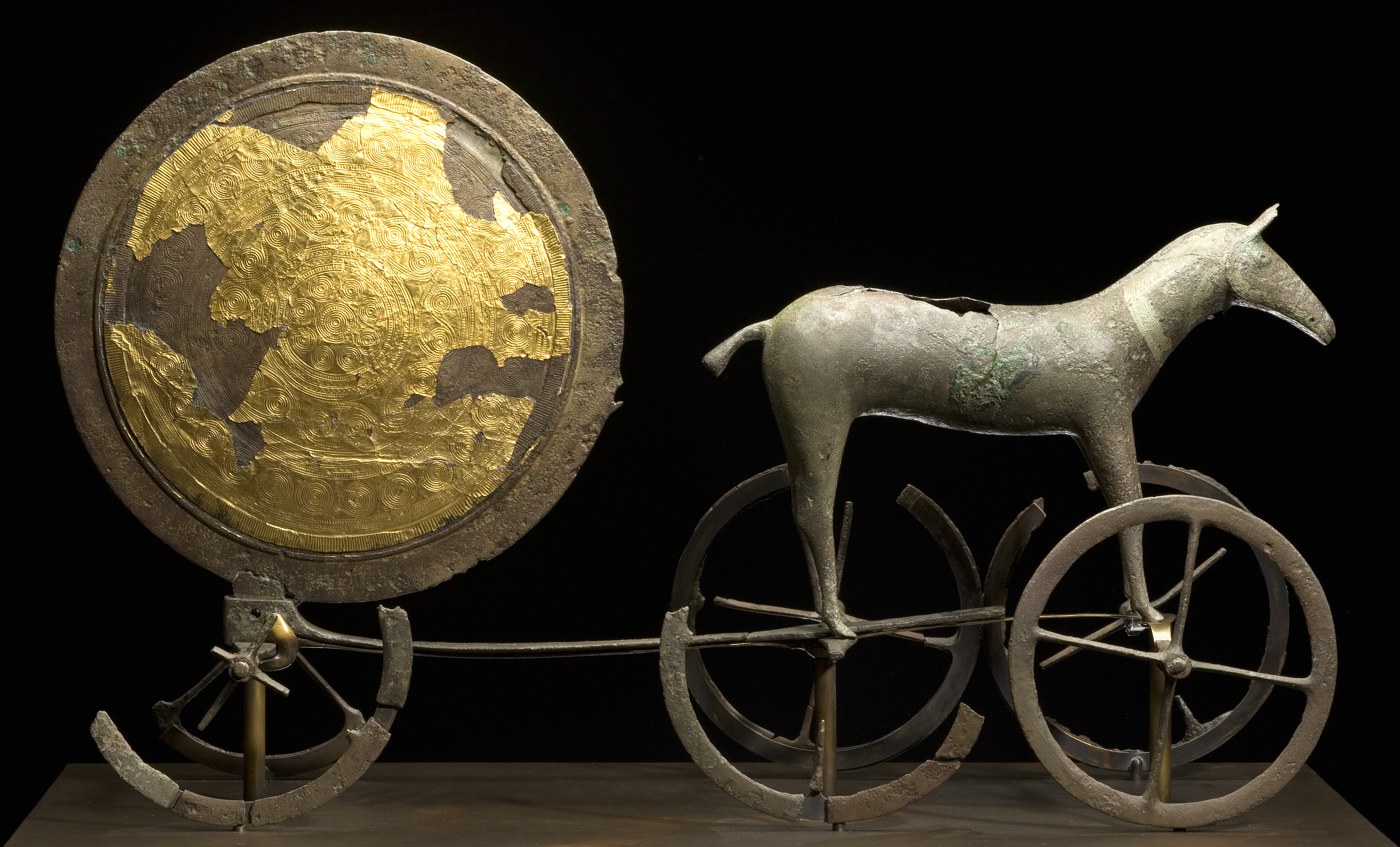
The Trundholm sun chariot from the Nordic Bronze Age (c. 1500-1300 BC), depicting the Sun being drawn by a chariot

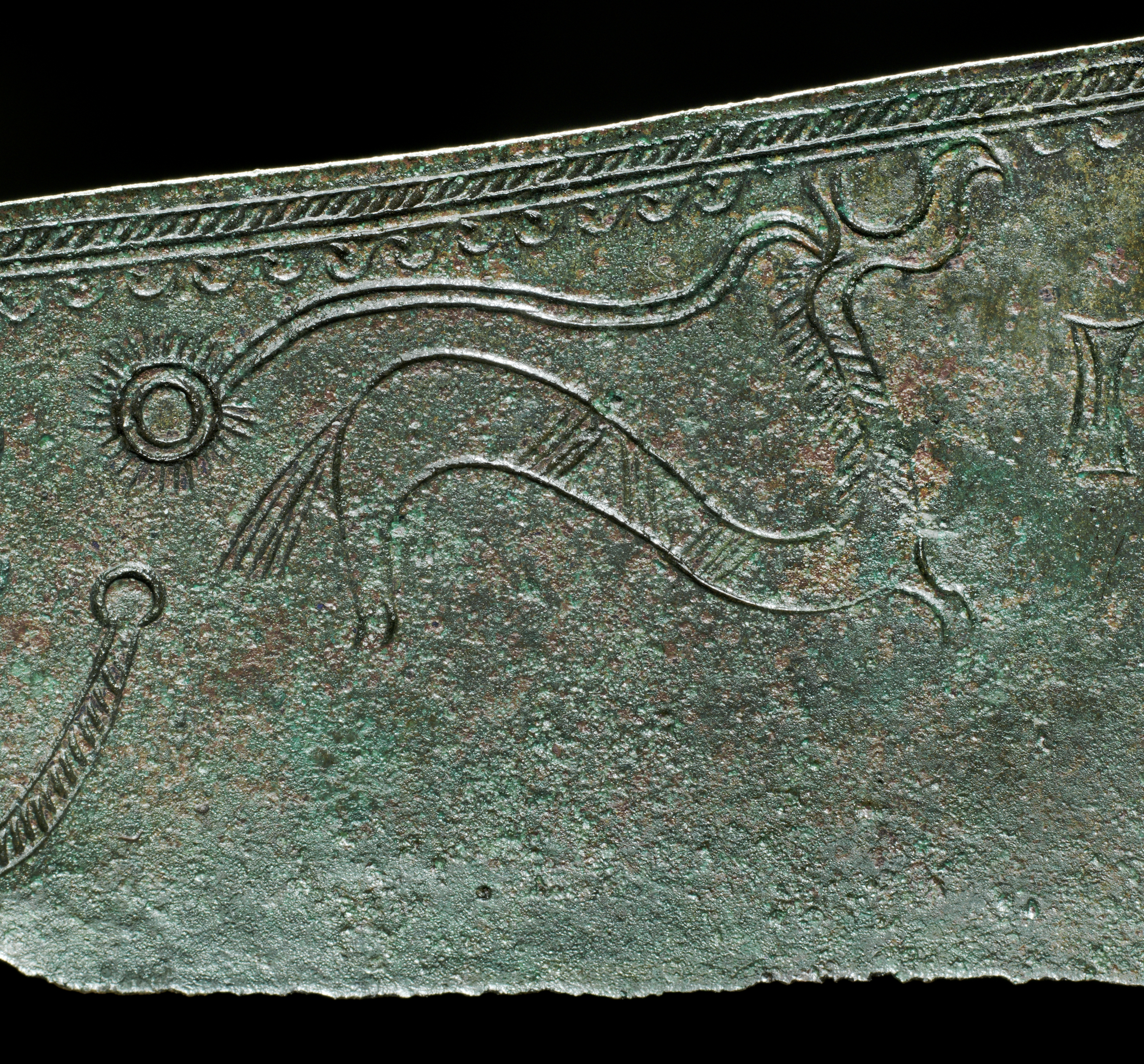
Bronze razor with a "sun horse" motif, found in Denmark

Scholars have proposed that Sól, as a goddess, may represent an extension of an earlier Proto-Indo-European deity due to Indo-European linguistic connections between Norse Sól, Sanskrit Surya, Common Brittonic Sulis, Lithuanian Saulė, Latin Sol, and Slavic Tsar Solnitse.

Regarding Sól's attested personifications in Norse mythology, John Lindow states that "even kennings like 'hall of the sun' for sky may not suggest personification, given the rules of kenning formation"; that in poetry only stanzas associated with Sól in the poem Vafþrúðnismál are certain in their personification of the goddess; and "that Sól is female and Máni male probably has to do with the grammatical gender of the nouns: Sól is feminine and Máni is masculine." Lindow states that, while the Sun seems to have been a focus of older Scandinavian religious practices, it is difficult to make a case for the placement of the sun in a central role in surviving sources for Norse mythology.

Rudolf Simek states that Nordic Bronze Age archaeological finds, such as rock carvings and the Trundholm sun chariot, provide ample evidence of the Sun having been viewed as a life-giving heavenly body to the Bronze Age Scandinavians, and that the Sun likely always received an amount of veneration. Simek states that the only evidence of the Sun assuming a personification stems from the Old High German Incantation reference and from Poetic Edda poems, and that both of these references do not provide enough information to assume a Germanic sun cult. "On the other hand", Simek posits, the "great age of the concept is evident" by the Trundholm sun chariot, which specifically supports the notion of the Sun being drawn across the sky by horses. Simek further theorizes that the combination of sun symbols with ships in religious practices, which occur with frequency from the Bronze Age into Middle Ages, seem to derive from religious practices surrounding a fertility god (such as the Vanir gods Njörðr or Freyr), and not to a personified sun.

== See also ==
- Dagr, the personified day in Norse mythology
- Solveig, an Old Norse female given name that may involve the Sun
- Sowilo rune, the s rune, named after the Sun
- List of solar deities
