= Emil Doepler =

German artist (1855–1922)

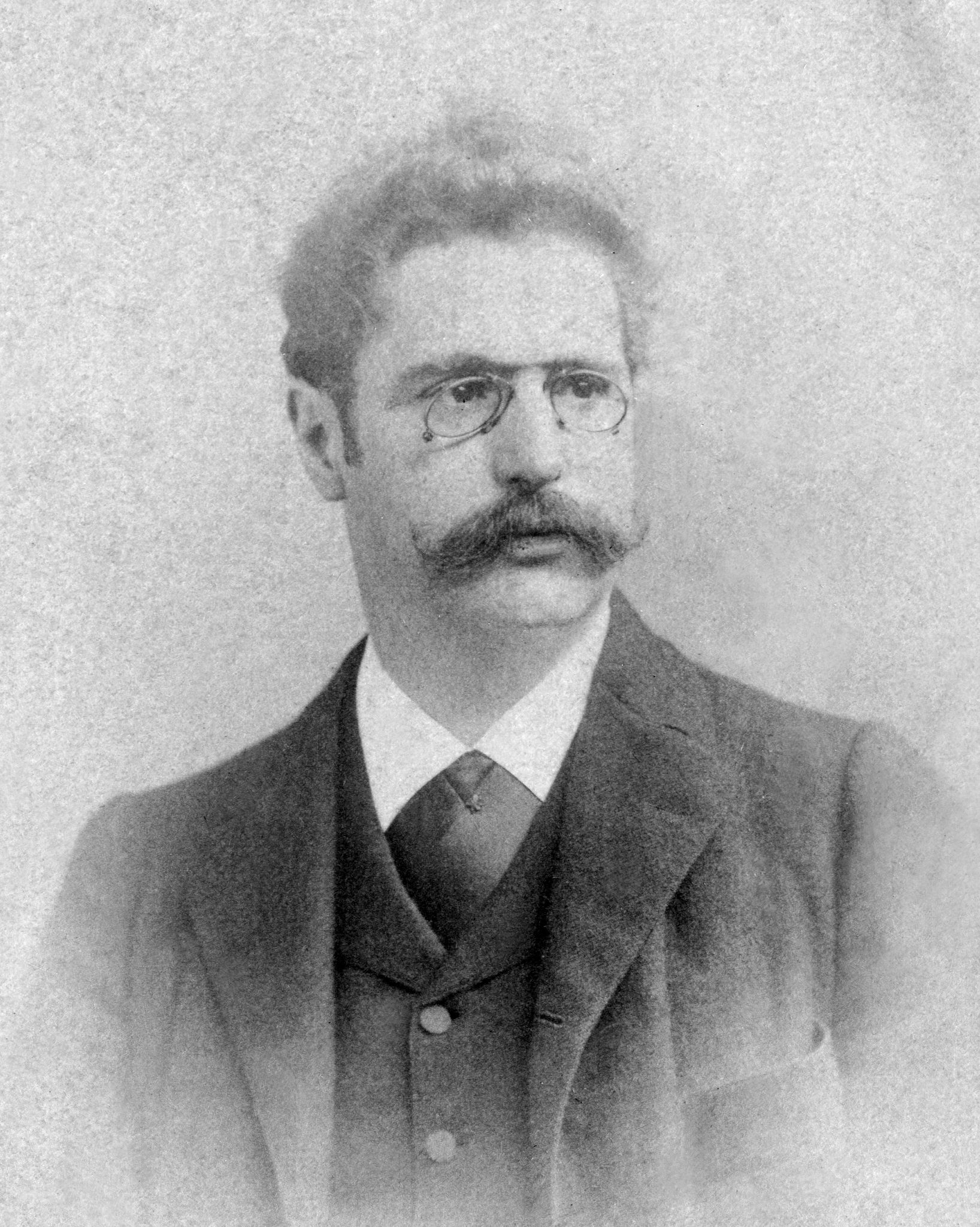
Emil Doepler, by Wilhelm Fechner (1890)

Emil Doepler (29 October 1855, in Munich – 21 December 1922, in Berlin) was a German illustrator, graphic artist, and heraldist. He is usually referred to as The Younger, to distinguish him from his father.

== Life and work ==
He was born to Carl Emil Doepler, an illustrator and designer, who was head of the costume department at the Bayreuth Festival. He was also Emil's first teacher. Heraldry was among his earliest interests, but he also created landscapes and still-lifes.

Coat-of-Arms, Weimar Republic

From 1870, he studied at the instructional annex of the Arts and Crafts Museum in Berlin. Upon graduating, in 1873, he worked as a free-lance illustrator. From 1876 to 1877, he took further lessons at the Prussian Academy of Arts. In 1881, he became a teacher at the Museum. In 1888, he designed the coat-of-arms for the Börsenverein des Deutschen Buchhandels, featuring Habent sua fata libelli (books have their destiny), the motto of the German publishing industry. He was promoted to Professor in 1889.

He also designed advertising materials, signs, and trading card pictures for the Stollwerck chocolate company. In 1898, he headed the “Committee for the Procurement and Monitoring of Artistic Stollwerck Pictures” (Komité zur Beschaffung und Ueberwachung künstlerischer Stollwerck-Bilder), founded by Ludwig Stollwerck. Other committee members included Woldemar Friedrich, Bruno Schmitz and Franz Skarbina. They also acted as judges for competitions. This was intended to give the cards a higher artistic value.

In 1899, he designed several variations of the company name, in an Art Nouveau font. Later, one of his students, Elli Hirsch, combined the lettering with a three-point crown, to create the company's logo. He married Hirsch in 1909. They had no children.

Designs for Stollwerck

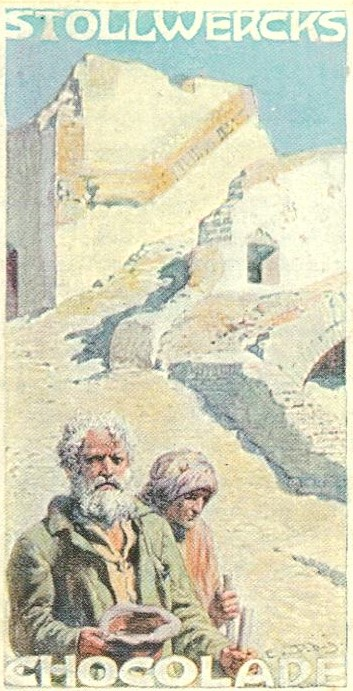
Earthquake

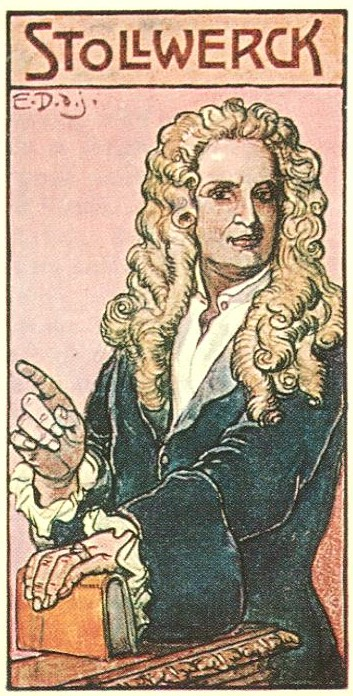
Sir Isaac Newton

In November 1919, Friedrich Ebert, President of the Weimar Republic, declared one of Doepler's designs to be Germany's official coat-of-arms. It served in that function until 1928. After that, it became an escutcheon; used for certain specific ceremonial purposes, such as a pennon for official vehicles. In 1949, West Germany began employing it for the same purposes. His designs also serve as the coats-of-arms for the cities of Essen and Bochum.
