= Carl Emil Doepler =

German painter, illustrator and costume designer

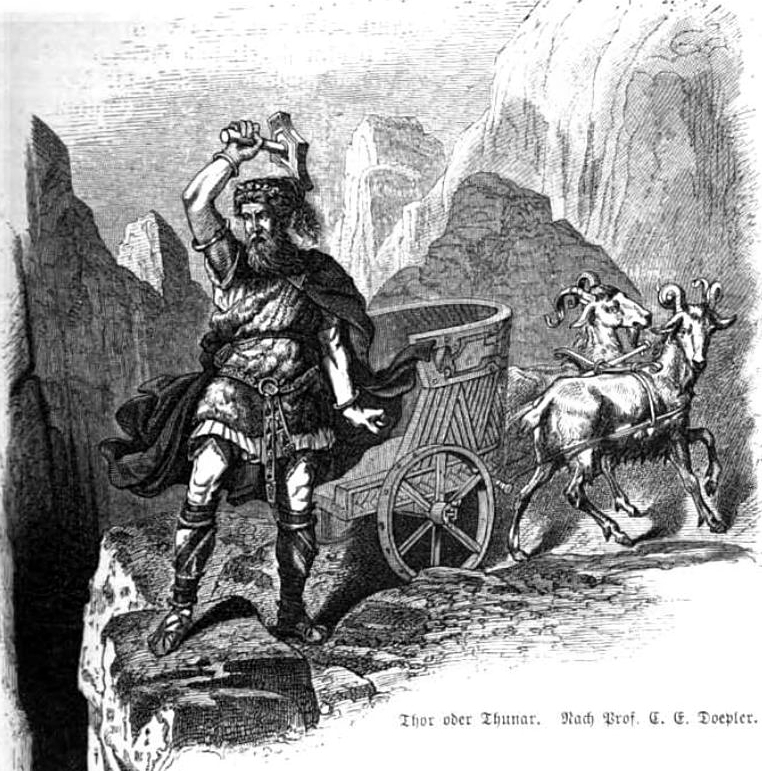
"Thor oder Thunar", one of Carl Emil Doepler's illustrations to Nordisch-germanische Götter und Helden

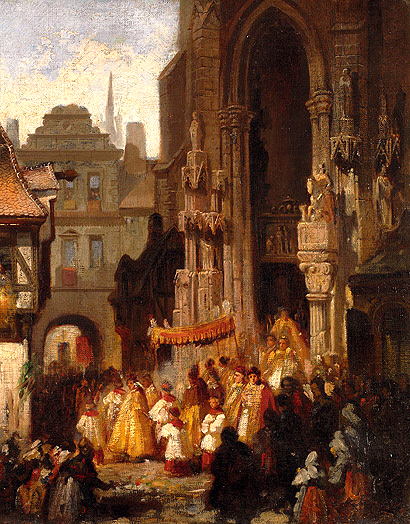
Fronleichnamsprozession

Carl Emil Doepler (1824–1905) was a German painter, illustrator and costume designer. He created the costumes for Richard Wagner's opera Der Ring des Nibelungen at the Bayreuther Festspiele in 1876. These costumes included horned helmets and are widely credited with starting the popular myth that Viking warriors wore horned helmets, even though there is no direct archaeological evidence to support this.

His son, Emil Doepler, was also an artist.

== See also ==
- List of German painters
