= Lóðurr =

Norse deity

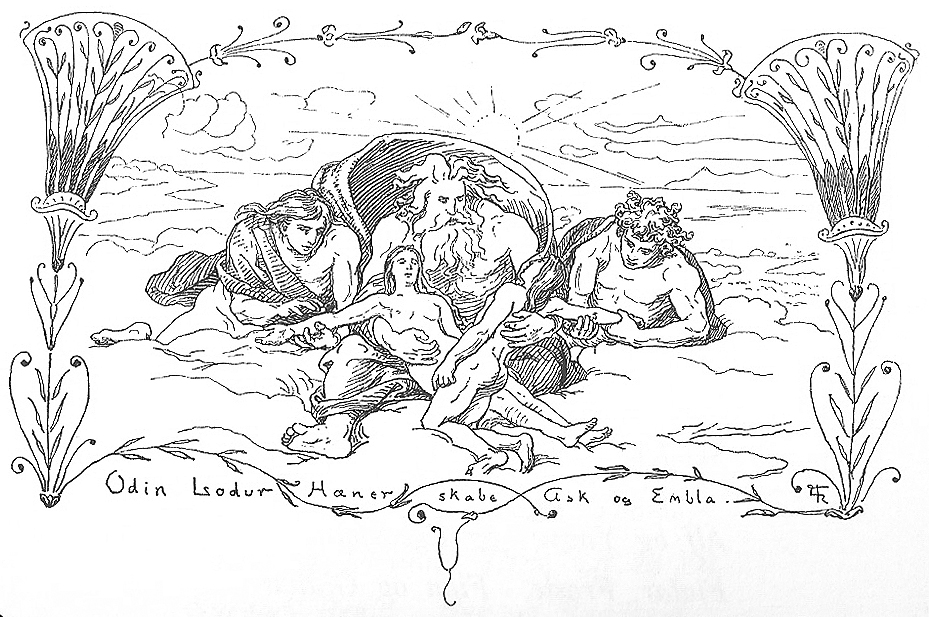
Odin, Lóðurr, and Hœnir create the first humans, Askr and Embla.

Lóðurr (Old Norse: [ˈloːðurː]; also Lodur or Lodurr) is a god in Norse mythology. In the Poetic Edda poem Völuspá, he is assigned a role in animating the first humans, but apart from that he is hardly ever mentioned, and remains obscure. Scholars have variously identified him with Loki, Vé, Vili, and Freyr, but consensus has not been reached on any one theory.

== Name and etymology ==
The name's meaning is unknown. It has been speculatively linked to various Old Norse words, such as lóð, "fruit, land", ljóðar, "people" and laða, "to attract". The Gothic words liudan, "to grow" and laudi, "shape", as well as the German word lodern, "to blaze", have also been mentioned in this context.

The metrical position of Lóðurr's name in the skaldic poem Íslendingadrápa, composed in the strict dróttkvætt metre, indicates that it contains the sound value /ó/ rather than /o/. This evidence, while strong, is not incontrovertible and some scholars have held out for a Loðurr reading. (Lóðurr's name can also be represented or anglicized as Lóður, Lódurr, Lódur, Lóthurr, Lóthur, Lódhurr, Lódhur, Lodurr, Lodur, Lothurr, Lothur, Lodhurr, Loðurr, Loður, or Lodhur.)

Danish and Norwegian lørdag, Swedish lördag, as well as Finnish lauantai, meaning "Saturday", may possibly derive from Lóður Dag although more typically the etymology is proposed to originate from "washing day".

In South Slavic languages, namely Serbian and Croatian, meaning of Lóðurr's name correlates with the Old Norse ljóðar, since the word "ljudi" means people. In context of land there are also similar words such as "led" meaning ice and "ledina" meaning clear land, a clearing.

== Attestations ==
=== Völuspá ===
In the Poetic Edda, the name Lóðurr occurs only once; in Völuspá, where the gods animate the first humans.

17. Unz þrír kvámu; ór því liði öflgir ok ástgir æsir at húsi, fundu á landi lítt megandi Ask ok Emblu örlöglausa.: 18. Önd þau né áttu, óð þau né höfðu, lá né læti né litu goða. Önd gaf Óðinn, óð gaf Hœnir, lá gaf Lóðurr ok litu góða. — Normalized text	17. Until three came; out of that company, mighty and loving Æsir to a house. They found on land, little capable, Ash and Embla, without destiny.: 18. Breath they had not, spirit they had not, no film of flesh nor cry of voice, nor comely hues. Breath Óðinn gave, spirit Hœnir gave, film of flesh Lóðurr gave and comely hues. — Dronke's translation	17. Until there came three; mighty and benevolent Æsir to the world from their assembly. They found on earth, nearly powerless, Ask and Embla, void of destiny.: 18. Spirit they possessed not, sense they had not, blood nor motive powers, nor goodly colour. Spirit gave Odin, sense gave Hoenir, blood gave Lodur, and goodly colour. — Thorpe's translation

The precise meaning of these strophes and their context in Völuspá is debated. Most relevant for the present discussion are Lóðurr's gifts of lá and litu góða. The word lá is obscure and the translations "film of flesh" and "blood" are just two of the many possibilities that have been suggested. The phrase "litu góða" is somewhat less difficult and traditionally interpreted as "good colours", "good shape", or even "good looks".

The 19th-century Swedish scholar Viktor Rydberg proposed a reading of litu goða, meaning "shape of gods", and saw the line as indication that the gods created human beings in their own image. While the manuscripts do not distinguish between the phonemes /o/ and /ó/, most other scholars have preferred the /ó/ reading for metrical reasons. The metrical structure of Völuspá's fornyrðislag is, however, not very rigid and in 1983 Rydberg's theory was championed again by Gro Steinsland. It remains debated.

=== Other attestations ===
Apart from the strophe in Völuspá, Lóðurr's name occurs only twice in the original sources. The name is found in the skaldic poems Háleygjatal and Íslendingadrápa where "Lóðurr's friend" is used as a kenning for Odin. This seems consistent with Lóðurr's role in Völuspá.

In Snorri Sturluson's Prose Edda, Lóðurr is conspicuously absent. Here the creation of humans is attributed to the sons of Borr, whom Snorri names elsewhere as Odin, Vili and Vé.

Normalized text of the R manuscript
Brodeur's translation

Þá er þeir Bors synir gengu með sævarströndu, fundu þeir tré tvau, ok tóku upp tréin ok sköpuðu af menn. Gaf hinn fyrsti [ö]nd ok líf, annarr vit ok hrœring, þriði ásjónu, málit ok heyrn ok sjón; gáfu þeim klæði [ok] nöfn. Hét karlmaðrinn Askr en konan Embla, ok ólusk þaðan af mannkindin, þeim er bygðin var gefin undir Miðgarði

When the sons of Borr were walking along the sea-strand, they found two trees, and took up the trees and shaped men of them: the first gave them spirit and life; the second, wit and feeling; the third, form, speech, hearing, and sight. They gave them clothing and names: the male was called Askr, and the female Embla, and of them was mankind begotten, which received a dwelling-place under Midgard.

Snorri often quotes Völuspá in his work, but in this case he does not. We cannot know whether he knew the strophes above or whether he was working entirely from other sources.

=== Nordendorf fibula ===
Another source sometimes brought into the discussion is the Nordendorf fibula. This artifact, dating from about 600 CE, contains the runic inscription logaþorewodanwigiþonar. This is usually interpreted as Logaþore Wodan Wigiþonar, where Wodan is Odin and Wigiþonar probably is Thor. It would be natural for logaþore to be the name of a third god, but there is no obvious identification in Norse mythology as we know it. Both Lóðurr and Loki have been proposed, but the etymological reasoning is tenuous, and firm conclusions cannot be reached.

== Theories ==
Since the Prose Edda mentions the sons of Borr in the same context as Völuspá does Hœnir and Lóðurr, some scholars have reasoned that Lóðurr might be another name for either Vili or Vé. Viktor Rydberg was an early proponent of this theory, but recently it has received little attention.

A more popular theory proposed by the scholar Ursula Dronke is that Lóðurr is "a third name of Loki/Loptr". The main argument for this is that the gods Odin, Hœnir, and Loki occur as a trio in Haustlöng, in the prose prologue to Reginsmál, and also in the Loka Táttur, a Faroese ballad which is a rare example of the occurrence of Norse gods in folklore. The Odin-kenning "Lóðurr's friend" furthermore appears to parallel the kenning "Loptr's friend" and Loki is similarly referred to as "Hœnir's friend" in Haustlöng, strengthening the trio connection. While many scholars agree with this identification, it is not universally accepted. One argument against it is that Loki appears as a malevolent being later in Völuspá, seemingly conflicting with the image of Lóðurr as a "mighty and loving" figure. Many scholars, including Jan de Vries and Georges Dumézil, have also identified Lóðurr as being the same deity as Loki.

Recently, Haukur Þorgeirsson of the University of Iceland has suggested that Loki and Lóðurr are in fact different names for the same deity, basing his contention on the observation that Loki is referred to as Lóður in the rimur Lokrur. Haukur argues that, regardless of whether the rimur is based on Snorri's Gylfaginning or a folksource, the writer must have derived the information about the identification either from a tradition or drawn the conclusion from a reading of the Eddic poems, since Snorri himself does not mention Lóðurr in his Edda. Since the contents of the Poetic Edda are assumed to have been forgotten around 1400, when the rimur was written, Haukur argues for a traditional identification. Haukur also points to Þrymlur where the same identification is made with Loki and Lóðurr. Haukur Þorgeirsson says that unless the possible but unlikely idea that the 14th and 15th century poets possessed lost written sources unknown to us, the idea must have come from either an unlikely amount of sources from where the poets could have drawn a similar conclusion that Loki and Lóðurr are identical like some recent scholars or that there still were remnants of an oral tradition. Haukur concludes that if Lóðurr was historically considered an independent deity from Loki, then a discussion of when and why he became identified with Loki is appropriate.

An identification with Freyr has also been proposed. This theory emphasizes the possible fertility-related meanings of Lóðurr's name but otherwise has little direct evidence to support it.
