= Hœnir =

Norse deity

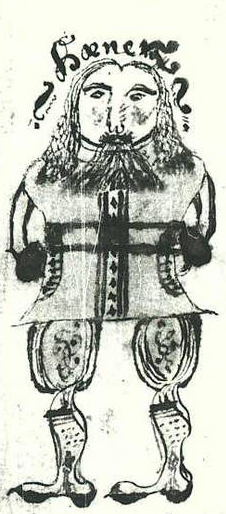
Hœnir in an illustration from a 17th-century Icelandic manuscript

In Norse mythology, Hœnir (also Hǿnir; modern Icelandic Hænir, modern Swedish Höner) is one of the Æsir. He is mentioned in Vǫluspá as one of the three gods (along with Odin and Lóðurr) that created the first humans.

== Attestations ==
In Völuspá, at the creation of the first human beings, Ask and Embla, Hœnir and Lóðurr help Odin. According to the Prose Edda, Hœnir is said to have given reason to man.

In Gylfaginning, Vili and Vé are mentioned instead. As Snorri Sturluson knew Völuspá, it is possible that Hœnir was another name for Vili. Also according to Völuspá, Hœnir was one of the few gods that would survive Ragnarök. In Ynglinga saga, along with Mímir, he went to the Vanir as a hostage to seal a truce after the Æsir-Vanir War. Upon arrival in Vanaheim, Hœnir, described here as large, handsome, and thought of by the vanir well-suited to be a chief, was immediately made chief. There, Hœnir was indecisive and relied on Mímir for all of his decisions, grunting noncommital answers when Mímir was absent.

Hœnir also has a minor role in Haustlöng and Reginsmál.

In the medieval Faroese ballad Lokka táttur, Hœnir protects a farmer's boy through summoning seven swans.

== Theories ==
According to Viktor Rydberg and other scholars, such as Gudbrand Vigfusson, the epithets langifótr 'Long-legs' and aurkonungr 'mud-king', together with the Greek cognate κύκνος 'swan' and Sanskrit शकुन (śakuna) 'bird of omen', suggest that Hœnir was connected with the stork. This seems to be supported by Hœnir's connection with the European folkloric legend of the stork delivering babies to their parents, and his role in the medieval folktale Loka Táttur, which further confirms his association with birds.

== Sources ==
- Viktor Rydberg 1886, Undersökningar i germanisk mythologi, first part.
