= Gauks =

Gauks may refer to:

- Olga Gauks (born 1987), German politician
- Gauks saga Trandilssonar, lost saga

== See also ==
- Gauk
- Gauke
