= Vili and Vé =

Norse deities

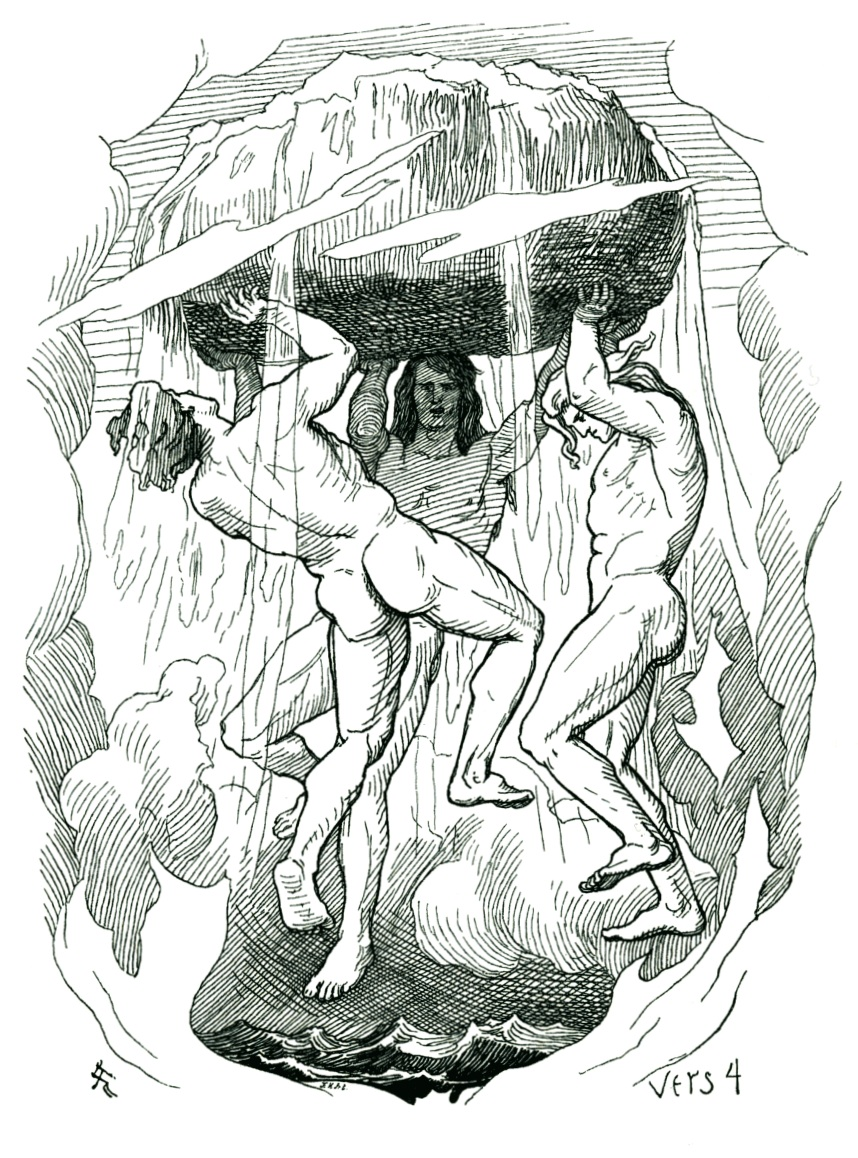
A depiction of Óðinn, Vili, and Vé creating the world by Lorenz Frølich

In Norse mythology, Vili (/ˈvɪli/ VILL-ee; Old Norse: [ˈwile]) and Vé (/ˈveɪ/ VAY; O.N.: [ˈweː]) are the brothers of the god Odin (from Old Norse Óðinn), sons of Bestla, daughter of Bölþorn; and Borr, son of Búri.

In Gylfaginning (Prose Edda), Odin, Vili and Ve created the world from the primordial giant Ymir. Afterwards they create the first human beings, Ask and Embla, from two trees found at the seashore.

In Völuspá, the names Hœnir and Lóðurr are mentioned instead of Vili and Ve. As Snorri Sturluson knew Völuspá, it is not unreasonable that Hœnir was another name for Vili, and Lóðurr would be Ve.

== Name ==
The Old Norse theonym Vé (or Véi) is cognate with Gothic weiha ('priest'), both stemming from Proto-Germanic *wīhōn, itself from the adjective *wīhaz, meaning 'holy' (cf. Goth. weihs, Old High German wīh). A related noun, *wīhan ('sanctuary'), can also be reconstructed on the basis of Old Norse vé ('sanctuary'), Old English wēoh ('idol'), and Old Saxon wīh ('temple').

Vili transparently means 'will' in Old Norse. It stems from the Proto-Germanic noun *weljōn ~ *weljan ('will, wish'; cf. Gothic wilja, Old English willa, and Old High German willo).

== Attestations ==
In Proto-Norse, the three brothers' names were alliterating, *Wōdinaz, Wiljô, Wīhaz, so that they can be taken as forming a triad of *wōdaz, wiljô, wīhą, approximately inspiration (transcendent, mantic or prophetic knowledge), cognition (will, desire, internal thought that leads to action) and numen (spiritual power residing in the external world, in sacred objects).

Compare to this alliteration in a verse found in the Exeter Book, Wôden worhte weos "Woden wrought the sanctuaries" — when compared to the "triad" above, just the middle will etymon has been replaced by the work etymon. The name of such sanctuaries to Woden, Wôdenes weohas (Old Saxon Wôdanes wih, Old Norse Óðins vé) survives in toponymy as Odinsvi, Wodeneswegs.

Vili and Vé, together with Óðinn, are portrayed as the three brothers who slew Ymir — ending the primeval rule of the race of giants — and are the first of the Æsir. Of the three, Óðinn is the eldest, Vili the middle, and Vé the youngest. To the first human couple, Ask and Embla, Óðinn gave soul and life; Vili (Hœnir) gave wit (intelligence) and sense of touch; and Vé (Lóðurr) gave countenance (appearance, facial expression), speech, hearing, and sight.

While Vili and Vé are of little prominence in Norse mythology as attested; their brother Óðinn has a more celebrated role as the chief of the Norse pantheon. Óðinn remains at the head of a triad of the mightiest gods: Óðinn, Þórr, and Freyr. In the Gylfaginning, first book of the prose Edda, Óðinn is also styled Þriði "the third", in which case he appears by the side of Hárr and Jafnhárr (the "high" and the "even-high" or "co-equal"), as the "Third High". At other times, he is Tveggi "the second". In relation to the Óðinn-Vili-Vé triad, Grimm compares Old High German willa, which not only expressed voluntas, but also votum, impetus, spiritus, and the personification of Will, to Wela in Old English sources. Keyser interprets the triad as "Spirit, Will and Holiness", postulating a kind of Germanic Trinity in Vili and Vé to be "blended together again in the all-embracing World-spirit — in Odin. [...] he alone is Al-father, from whom all the other superior, world-directing beings, the Æsir, are descended."

According to Loki, in Lokasenna, Vili and Vé had an affair with Óðinn's wife, Frigg. This is taken by Grimm as reflecting the fundamental identity of the three brothers, so that Frigg might be considered the wife of either. According to this story Óðinn was abroad for a long time, and in his absence his brothers acted for him. It is worthy of note that Saxo Grammaticus also makes Óðinn (Latin: Othinus) travel to foreign lands and Mitoðinn (Latin: Mithothyn) fill his place, and therefore Mitoðinn's position throws light on that of Vili and Vé. But Saxo represents Óðinn as once more an exile, and puts Ullr (Latin: Ollerus) in his place.

Chapter 3 of Heimskringla says that Odin had two brothers, Vili and Vé. While Odin was gone, his brothers governed his realm. Once Odin was gone for so long that the Æsir believed that he would not return, his brothers began to divvy up Odin's inheritance, "but his wife Frigg they shared between them. However, afterwards, [Odin] returned and took possession of his wife again".

== See also ==
- High, Just-as-High, and Third
- Hœnir
- Lóðurr
