= Gauks saga Trandilssonar =

Lost Icelandic saga

The Saga of Gaukur á Stöng is believed to have existed but is now considered lost. The saga – set in the anthology of sagas known as Möðruvallabók between Njáls saga and Egils saga Skalla-Grímssonar – tells of a man named Gaukur Trandilsson who lived in the 10th century. Gaukur is mentioned in chapter 26 of Njáls saga. Icelandic professor and poet Jón Helgason managed to decipher a line that read: "Let Trandilsson's story be written here. I am told that [Mr.] Grim knows it." However, the story was never put to parchment. The Grim mentioned in the manuscript is believed to have been Grímur Þorsteinsson, knight and governor (c. 1350).

Gaukur is reported to have been an exceptionally brave and gentle man. He was the foster brother of Ásgrimur. However, it is said that he had a falling out with his foster brother, who ultimately killed him.

Gaukur must have been a well-known figure in Icelandic folklore as he is mentioned in not only Njáls Saga but also Íslendingadrápa, a poem about Icelandic heroes. He is also mentioned on a tomb in the Orkney Islands, where a runic inscription translates to: "These runes were carved by the man who was the most knowledgeable of runes in the west of the sea, using the axe that belonged to Gaukur Trandilsson in the south of the land". The south of the land refers to Iceland.
