= Odin =

Widely revered deity in Germanic mythology

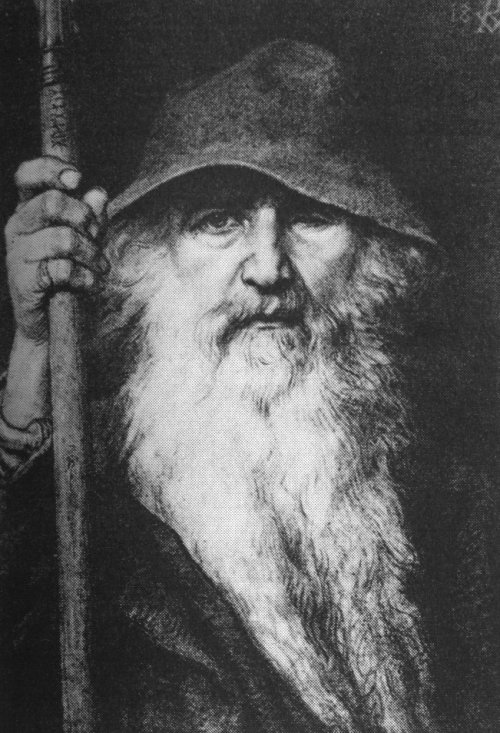
Odin, in his guise as a wanderer, as imagined by Georg von Rosen (1886)

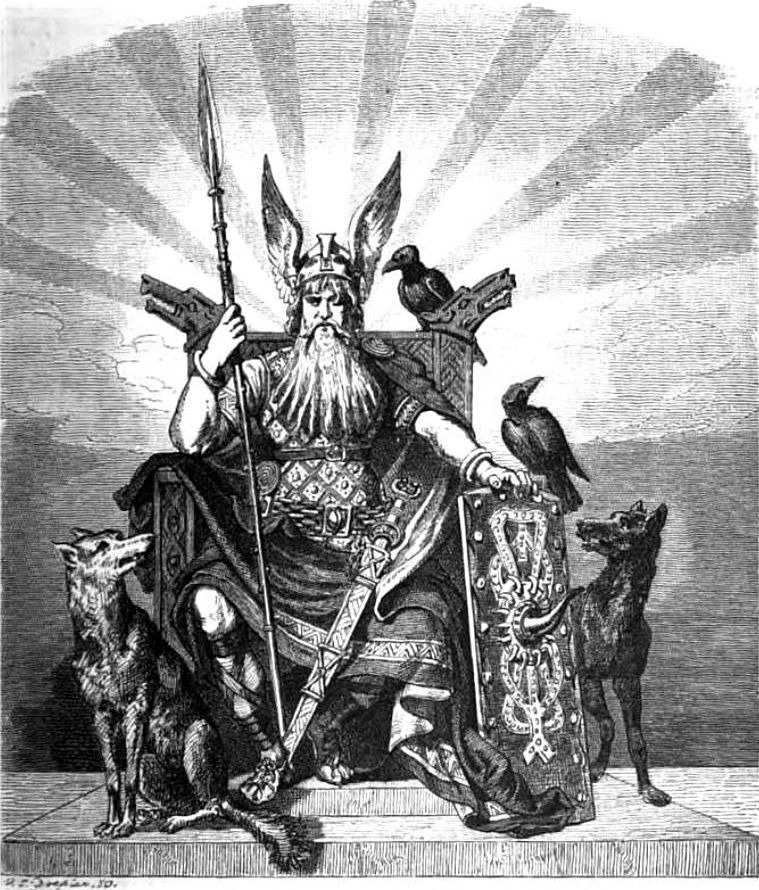
Odin enthroned, with his spear Gungnir and flanked by his ravens Huginn and Muninn and his wolves Geri and Freki, as imagined by Carl Emil Doepler (1880)

Odin (/ˈoʊdɪn/; from Old Norse: Óðinn) is a widely revered god in Norse mythology and Germanic paganism. Most surviving information on Odin comes from Norse mythology, but he figures prominently in the recorded history of Northern Europe. This includes the Roman Empire's partial occupation of Germania (c. 2 BCE), the Migration Period (4th–6th centuries CE) and the Viking Age (8th–11th centuries CE). Consequently, Odin has hundreds of names and titles. Several of these stem from the reconstructed Proto-Germanic theonym Wōðanaz, meaning "lord of frenzy" or "leader of the possessed", which may relate to the god's strong association with poetry.

Most mythological stories about Odin survive from the 13th-century Prose Edda and an earlier collection of Old Norse poems, the Poetic Edda, along with other Old Norse items like Ynglinga saga. The Prose Edda and other sources depict Odin as the head of the pantheon, sometimes called the Æsir, (Note: The term "Æsir" is of unclear meaning. For example, some use the term as meaning all of the gods while others use it to refer a particular group of gods, excluding the Vanir.) and bearing a spear and a ring. Wider sources depict Odin as the son of Bestla and Borr; brother to Vili and Vé; and husband to the goddess Frigg, with whom he fathered Baldr. Odin has many other sons, including Thor, whom he sired with the earth-goddess Jörð. He is sometimes accompanied by animal familiars, such as the ravens Huginn and Muninn and the wolves Geri and Freki. The Prose Edda describes Odin and his brothers' creation of the world through slaying the primordial being Ymir, and his giving of life to the first humans Ask and Embla. Odin is often referred to as long-bearded, sometimes as an old man, and also as possessing only one eye, having sacrificed the other for wisdom.

Odin is widely regarded as a god of the dead and warfare. In this role, he receives slain warriors—the einherjar—at Valhöll ("Carrion-hall" or "Hall of the Slain") in the realm of Asgard. The Poetic Edda associates him with Valkyries, perhaps as their leader. In the mythic future, Odin leads the einherjar at Ragnarök, where he is killed by the monstrous wolf Fenrir. Accounts by early travellers to Northern Europe describe human sacrifices being made to Odin. In Old English texts, Odin is euhemerized as an ancestral figure for royalty and is frequently depicted as a founding figure for various Germanic peoples, such as the Langobards. In some later folklore, he is a leader of the Wild Hunt, a ghostly procession of the dead.

Odin has an attested history spanning over a thousand years. He is an important subject of interest to Germanic scholars. Some scholars consider the god's relations to other figures—as reflected, for example in the etymological similarity of his name to the name of Freyja's husband Óðr. Others discuss his historical lineage, exploring whether he derives from Proto-Indo-European mythology or developed later in Germanic society. In modern times, most forms of the new religious movement Heathenry venerate him; in some, he is the central deity. The god regularly features across all forms of modern media, especially genre fiction, and—alongside others in the Germanic pantheon—has lent his name to a day of the week, Wednesday, in many languages.

== Name ==
=== Etymological origin ===
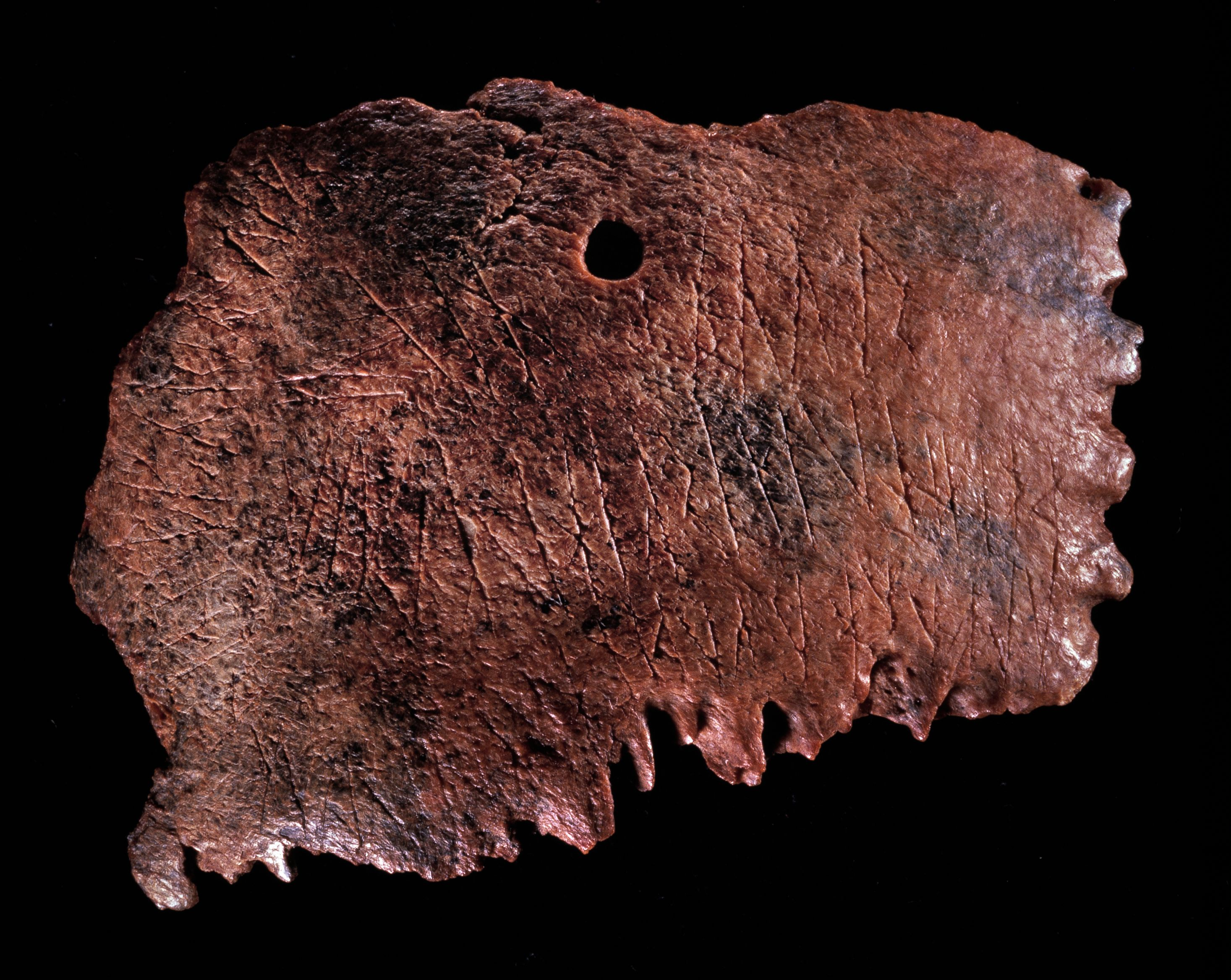
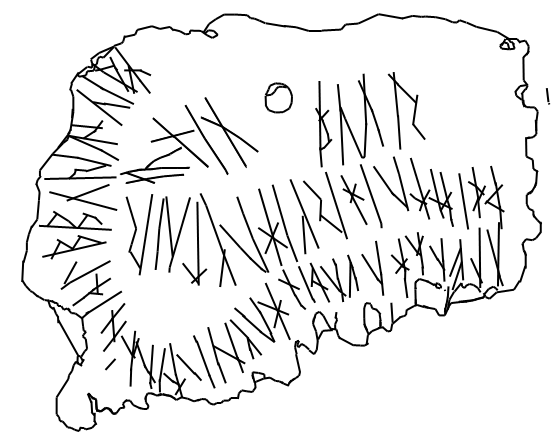
Picture of the Ribe skull fragment and illustration showing runes

The Old Norse theonym Óðinn (runic ᚢᚦᛁᚾ on the Ribe skull fragment) is a cognate of other medieval Germanic names, including Old English Wōden, Old Saxon Wōdan, Old Dutch Wuodan, and Old High German Wuotan (Old Bavarian Wûtan). They all derive from the reconstructed Proto-Germanic masculine theonym *Wōðanaz (or *Wōdunaz). Translated as 'lord of frenzy', or as 'leader of the possessed', *Wōðanaz stems from the Proto-Germanic adjective *wōðaz ('possessed, inspired, delirious, raging') attached to the suffix *-naz ('master of').

Internal and comparative evidence all point to the ideas of a divine possession or inspiration, and an ecstatic divination. In his Gesta Hammaburgensis ecclesiae pontificum (1075–1080 AD), Adam of Bremen explicitly associates Wodan with the Latin term furor, which can be translated as 'rage', 'fury', 'madness', or 'frenzy' (Wodan id est furor : "Odin, that is, furor"). As of 2011, an attestation of Proto-Norse Woðinz, on the Strängnäs stone, has been accepted as probably authentic, but the name may be used as a related adjective instead meaning "with a gift for (divine) possession" (ON: øðinn).

Other Germanic cognates derived from *wōðaz include Gothic woþs ('possessed'), Old Norse óðr ('mad, frantic, furious'), Old English wōd ('insane, frenzied') and Dutch woed ('frantic, wild, crazy'), along with the substantivized forms Old Norse óðr ('mind, wit, sense; song, poetry'), Old English wōþ ('sound, noise; voice, song'), Old High German wuot ('thrill, violent agitation') and Middle Dutch woet ('rage, frenzy'), from the same root as the original adjective. The Proto-Germanic terms *wōðīn ('madness, fury') and *wōðjanan ('to rage') can also be reconstructed. Early epigraphic attestations of the adjective include un-wōdz ('calm one', i.e. 'not-furious'; 200 CE) and wōdu-rīde ('furious rider'; 400 CE).

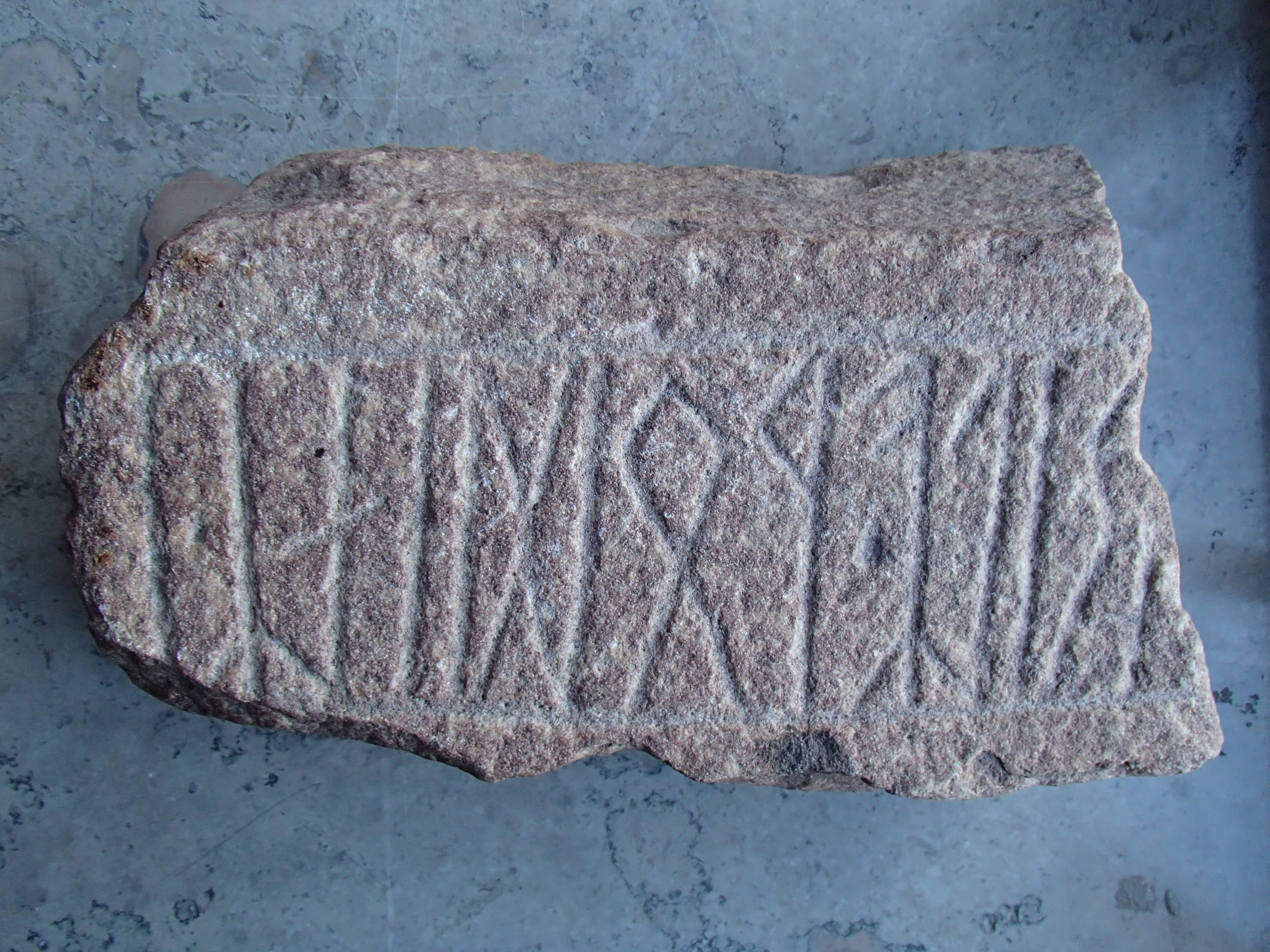
Woðinz (read from right to left), a probably authentic attestation of a pre-Viking Age form of Odin, on the Strängnäs stone

Philologist Jan de Vries has argued that the Old Norse deities Óðinn and Óðr were probably originally connected (as in the doublet Ullr–Ullinn), with Óðr (*wōðaz) being the elder form and the ultimate source of the name Óðinn (*wōða-naz). He further suggested that the god of rage Óðr–Óðinn stood in opposition to the god of glorious majesty Ullr–Ullinn in a similar manner to the Vedic contrast between Varuna and Mitra.

The adjective *wōðaz ultimately stems from a Pre-Germanic form *uoh₂-tós, which is related to the Proto-Celtic terms *wātis, meaning 'seer, sooth-sayer' (cf. Gaulish wāteis, Old Irish fáith 'prophet') and *wātus, meaning 'prophesy, poetic inspiration' (cf. Old Irish fáth 'prophetic wisdom, maxims', Old Welsh guaut 'prophetic verse, panegyric'). According to some scholars, the Latin term vātēs ('prophet, seer') is probably a Celtic loanword from the Gaulish language, making *uoh₂-tós ~ *ueh₂-tus ('god-inspired') a shared religious term common to Germanic and Celtic rather than an inherited word of earlier Proto-Indo-European (PIE) origin. In the case a borrowing scenario is excluded, a PIE etymon *(H)ueh₂-tis ('prophet, seer') can also be posited as the common ancestor of the attested Germanic, Celtic and Latin forms.

=== Other names ===
More than 170 names are recorded for Odin; the names are variously descriptive of attributes of the god, refer to myths involving him, or refer to religious practices associated with him. This multitude makes Odin the god with the most known names among the Germanic peoples. Steve Martin has pointed out that the name Odinsberg (Ounesberry, Ounsberry, Othenburgh) in Cleveland Yorkshire, now corrupted to Roseberry (Topping), may derive from the time of the Anglian settlements, with nearby Newton under Roseberry and Great Ayton having Anglo Saxon suffixes. The very dramatic rocky peak was an obvious place for divine association, and may have replaced Bronze Age/Iron Age beliefs of divinity there, given that a hoard of bronze votive axes and other objects was buried by the summit. It could be a rare example, then, of Nordic-Germanic theology displacing earlier Celtic mythology in an imposing place of tribal prominence.

In his opera cycle Der Ring des Nibelungen, Richard Wagner refers to the god as Wotan, a spelling of his own invention which combines the Old High German Wuotan with the Low German Wodan.

=== Origin of Wednesday ===
The modern English weekday name Wednesday derives from Old English Wōdnesdæg, meaning 'day of Wōden'. Cognate terms are found in other Germanic languages, such as Middle Low German and Middle Dutch Wōdensdach (modern Dutch woensdag), Old Frisian Wērnisdei (≈ Wērendei) and Old Norse Óðinsdagr (cf. Danish, Norwegian, Swedish onsdag). All of these terms derive from Late Proto-Germanic *Wodanesdag ('Day of Wōðanaz'), a calque of Latin Mercurii dies ('Day of Mercury'; cf. modern Italian mercoledì, French mercredi, Spanish miércoles).

== Attestations ==
=== Roman era to Migration Period ===
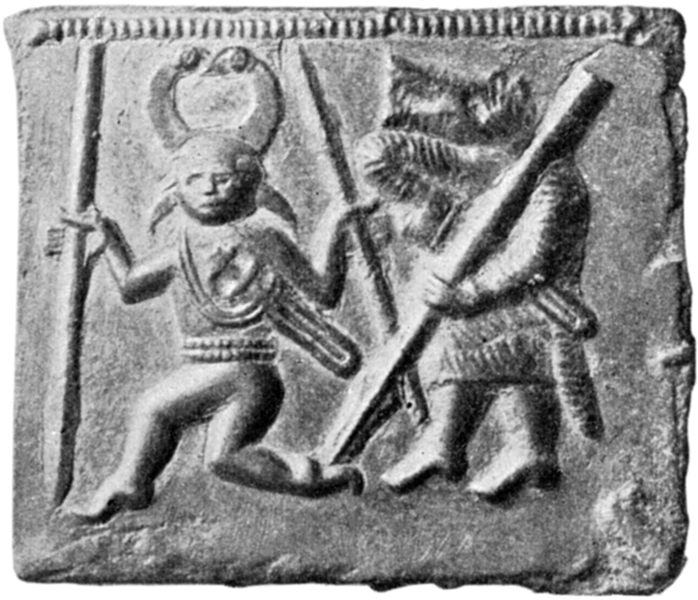
One of the Torslunda plates. The figure to the left was cast with both eyes, but afterwards the right eye was removed.

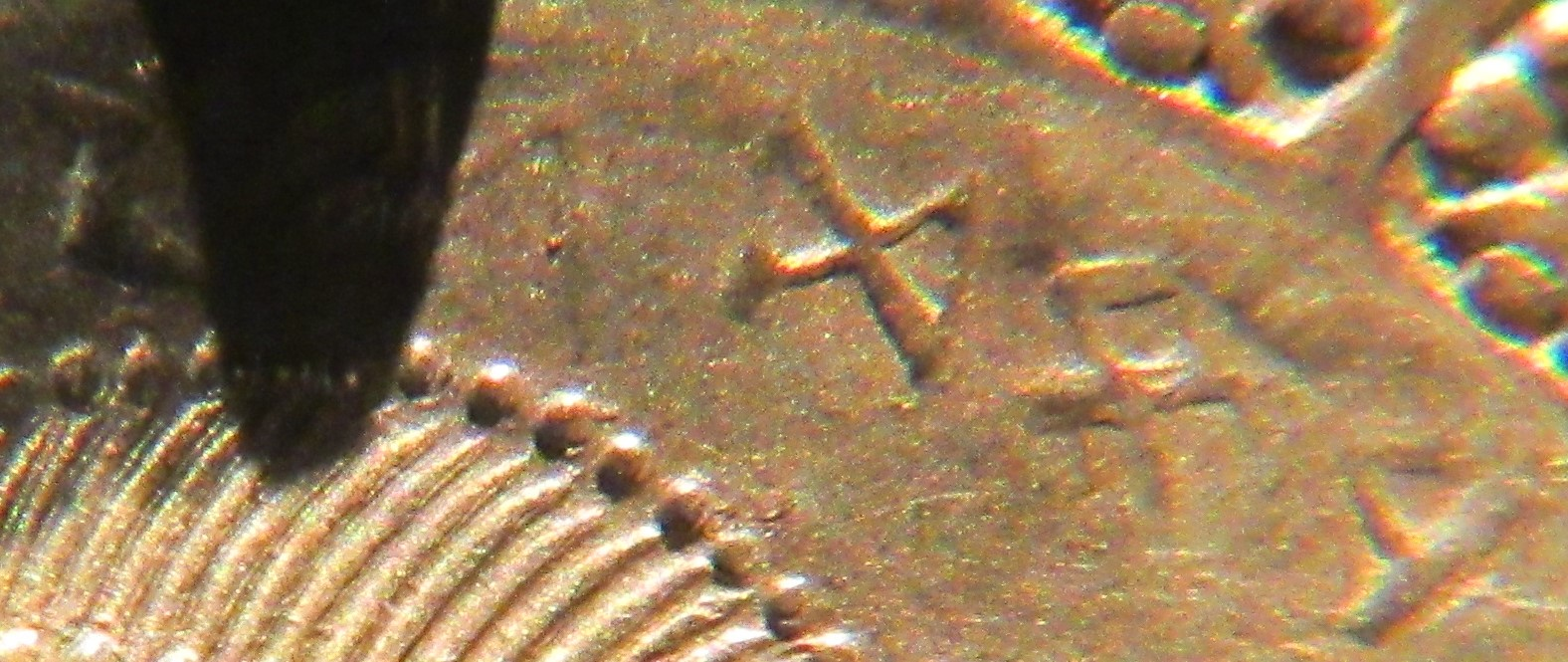
The name Wōđnas on a bracteate from the early 5th century AD, written as mirrored text

The earliest records of the Germanic peoples were recorded by the Romans, and in these works Odin is frequently referred to—via a process known as interpretatio romana (where characteristics perceived to be similar by Romans result in identification of a non-Roman god as a Roman deity)—as the Roman god Mercury. The first clear example of this occurs in the Roman historian Tacitus's late 1st-century work Germania, where, writing about the religion of the Suebi (a confederation of Germanic peoples), he comments that "among the gods Mercury is the one they principally worship. They regard it as a religious duty to offer to him, on fixed days, human as well as other sacrificial victims. Hercules and Mars they appease by animal offerings of the permitted kind" and adds that a portion of the Suebi also venerate "Isis". In this instance, Tacitus refers to the god Odin as "Mercury", Thor as "Hercules", and Týr as "Mars". The "Isis" of the Suebi has been debated and may represent "Freyja".

Anthony Birley noted that Odin's apparent identification with Mercury has little to do with Mercury's classical role of being messenger of the gods, but appears to be due to Mercury's role of psychopomp. Other contemporary evidence may also have led to the equation of Odin with Mercury; Odin, like Mercury, may have at this time already been pictured with a staff and hat, may have been considered a trader god, and the two may have been seen as parallel in their roles as wandering deities. But their rankings in their respective religious spheres may have been very different. Also, Tacitus's "among the gods Mercury is the one they principally worship" is an exact quote from Julius Caesar's Commentarii de Bello Gallico (1st century BCE) in which Caesar is referring to the Gauls and not the Germanic peoples. Regarding the Germanic peoples, Caesar states: "[T]hey consider the gods only the ones that they can see, the Sun, Fire and the Moon", which scholars reject as clearly mistaken, regardless of what may have led to the statement.

There is no direct, undisputed evidence for the worship of Odin/Mercury among the Goths, and the existence of a cult of Odin among them is debated. Richard North and Herwig Wolfram have both argued that the Goths did not worship Odin, Wolfram contending that the use of Greek names of the week in Gothic provides evidence of that. One possible reading of the Gothic Ring of Pietroassa is that the inscription "gutaniowi hailag" means "sacred to Wodan-Jove", but this is highly disputed.

The earliest clear reference to Odin by name is found on a C-bracteate discovered in Denmark in 2020, part of the Vindelev Hoard. Dated to as early as the 400s, the bracteate features a Proto-Norse Elder Futhark inscription reading "He is Odin’s man" (iz Wōd[a]nas weraz). Although the English kingdoms were nominally converted to Christianity by the end of the 7th century, Woden is frequently listed as a founding figure among the Old English royalty.

Odin is also either directly or indirectly mentioned a few times in the surviving Old English poetic corpus, including the Nine Herbs Charm and likely also the Old English rune poem. Odin may also be referenced in the riddle Solomon and Saturn. In the Nine Herbs Charm, Woden is said to have slain a wyrm (serpent, Germanic dragon) by way of nine "glory twigs". Preserved from an 11th-century manuscript, the poem is, according to Bill Griffiths, "one of the most enigmatic of Old English texts". The section that mentions Woden is as follows:

+ wyrm com snican, toslat he nan,
ða genam woden VIIII wuldortanas,
sloh ða þa næddran þæt heo on VIIII tofleah
Þær gaændade æppel and attor
þæt heo næfre ne wolde on hus bugan.

Translation:

A serpent came crawling (but) it destroyed no one
when Woden took nine twigs of glory,
(and) then struck the adder so that it flew into nine (pieces).
There archived apple and poison
that it never would re-enter the house.

— Bill Griffiths (2006)

The emendation of nan to 'man' has been proposed. The next stanza comments on the creation of the herbs chervil and fennel while hanging in heaven by the 'wise lord' (witig drihten) and before sending them down among mankind. Regarding this, Griffith comments that "In a Christian context 'hanging in heaven' would refer to the crucifixion; but (remembering that Woden was mentioned a few lines previously) there is also a parallel, perhaps a better one, with Odin, as his crucifixion was associated with learning." The Old English gnomic poem Maxims I also mentions Woden by name in the (alliterative) phrase Woden worhte weos, ('Woden made idols'), in which he is contrasted with and denounced against the Christian God.

The Old English rune ós, which is described in the Old English rune poem

The Old English rune poem recounts the Old English runic alphabet, the futhorc. The stanza for the rune ós reads as follows:

ōs byþ ordfruma ǣlcre sprǣce
wīsdōmes wraþu and wītena frōfur
and eorla gehwām ēadnys and tō hiht

Translation:

god is the origin of all language
wisdom's foundation and wise man's comfort
and to every hero blessing and hope

— Stephen Pollington (2008)

The first word of this stanza, ōs (Latin 'mouth') is a homophone for Old English os, a particularly heathen word for 'god'. Due to this and the content of the stanzas, several scholars have posited that this poem is censored, having originally referred to Odin. Kathleen Herbert comments that "Os was cognate with As in Norse, where it meant one of the Æsir, the chief family of gods. In Old English, it could be used as an element in first names: Osric, Oswald, Osmund, etc. but it was not used as a word to refer to the God of Christians. Woden was equated with Mercury, the god of eloquence (among other things). The tales about the Norse god Odin tell how he gave one of his eyes in return for wisdom; he also won the mead of poetic inspiration. Luckily for Christian rune-masters, the Latin word os could be substituted without ruining the sense, to keep the outward form of the rune name without obviously referring to Woden."

In the prose narrative of Solomon and Saturn, "Mercurius the Giant" (Mercurius se gygand) is referred to as an inventor of letters. This may also be a reference to Odin, who is in Norse mythology the founder of the runic alphabets, and the gloss a continuation of the practice of equating Odin with Mercury found as early as Tacitus. One of the Solomon and Saturn poems is additionally in the style of later Old Norse material featuring Odin, such as the Old Norse poem Vafþrúðnismál, featuring Odin and the jötunn Vafþrúðnir engaging in a deadly game of wits.

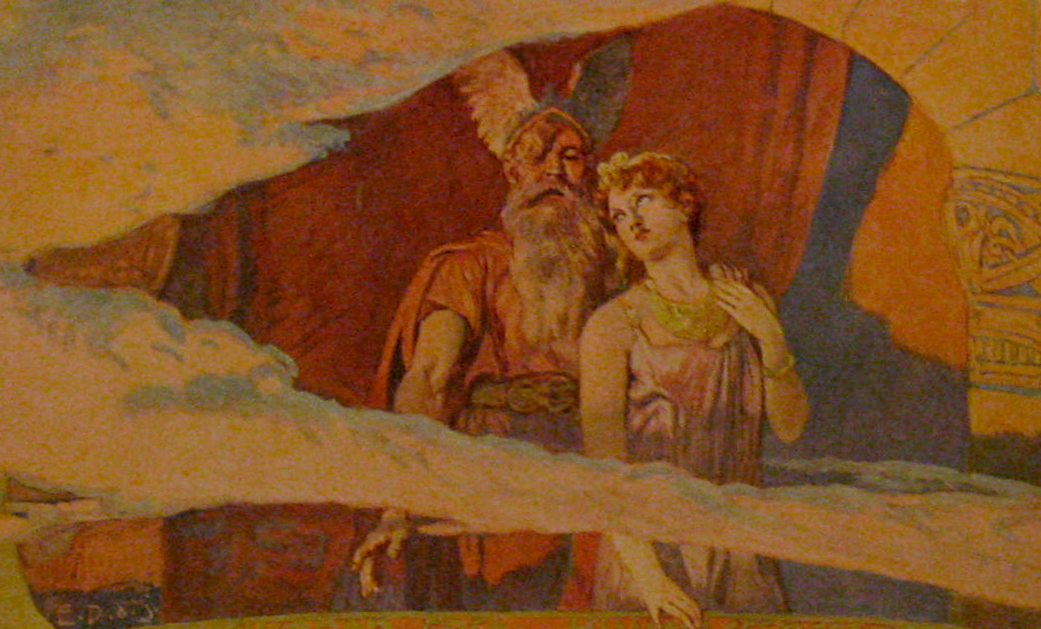
Odin and Frea look down from their window in the heavens to the Winnili women in an illustration by Emil Doepler, 1905.

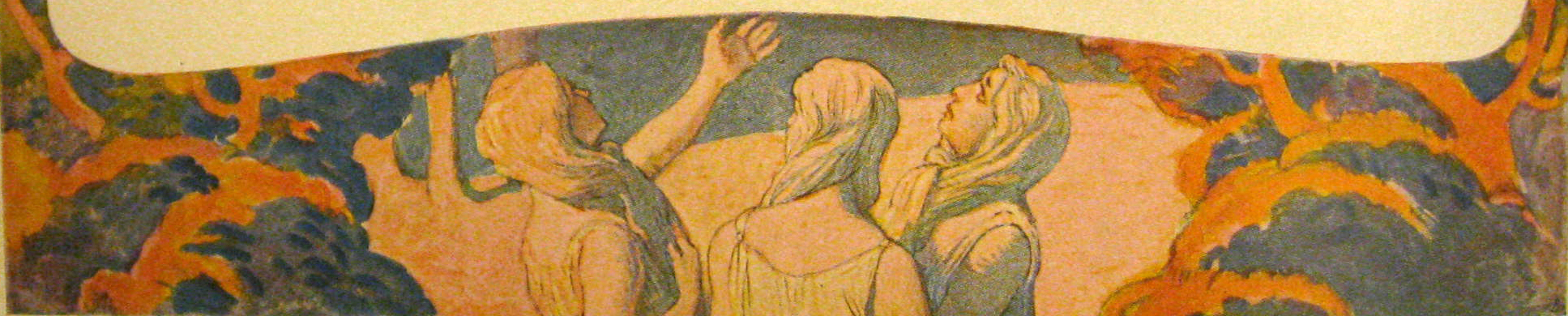
Winnili women with their hair tied as beards look up at Godan and Frea in an illustration by Emil Doepler, 1905.

The 7th-century Origo Gentis Langobardorum, and Paul the Deacon's 8th-century Historia Langobardorum derived from it, recount a founding myth of the Langobards (Lombards), a Germanic people who ruled a region of the Italian Peninsula. According to this legend, a "small people" known as the Winnili were ruled by a woman named Gambara who had two sons, Ybor and Aio. The Vandals, ruled by Ambri and Assi, came to the Winnili with their army and demanded that they pay them tribute or prepare for war. Ybor, Aio, and their mother Gambara rejected their demands for tribute. Ambri and Assi then asked the god Godan for victory over the Winnili, to which Godan responded (in the longer version in the Origo): "Whom I shall first see when at sunrise, to them will I give the victory."

Meanwhile, Ybor and Aio called upon Frea, Godan's wife. Frea counselled them that "at sunrise the Winnil[i] should come, and that their women, with their hair let down around the face in the likeness of a beard should also come with their husbands". At sunrise, Frea turned Godan's bed around to face east and woke him. Godan saw the Winnili and their whiskered women and asked, "who are those Long-beards?" Frea responded to Godan, "As you have given them a name, give them also the victory". Godan did so, "so that they should defend themselves according to his counsel and obtain the victory". Thenceforth the Winnili were known as the Langobards ('long-beards').

Writing in the mid-7th century, Jonas of Bobbio wrote that earlier that century the Irish missionary Columbanus disrupted an offering of beer to Odin (vodano) "(whom others called Mercury)" in Swabia. A few centuries later, 9th-century document from what is now Mainz, Germany, known as the Old Saxon Baptismal Vow records the names of three Old Saxon gods, UUôden ('Woden'), Saxnôte, and Thunaer ('Thor'), whom pagan converts were to renounce as demons.

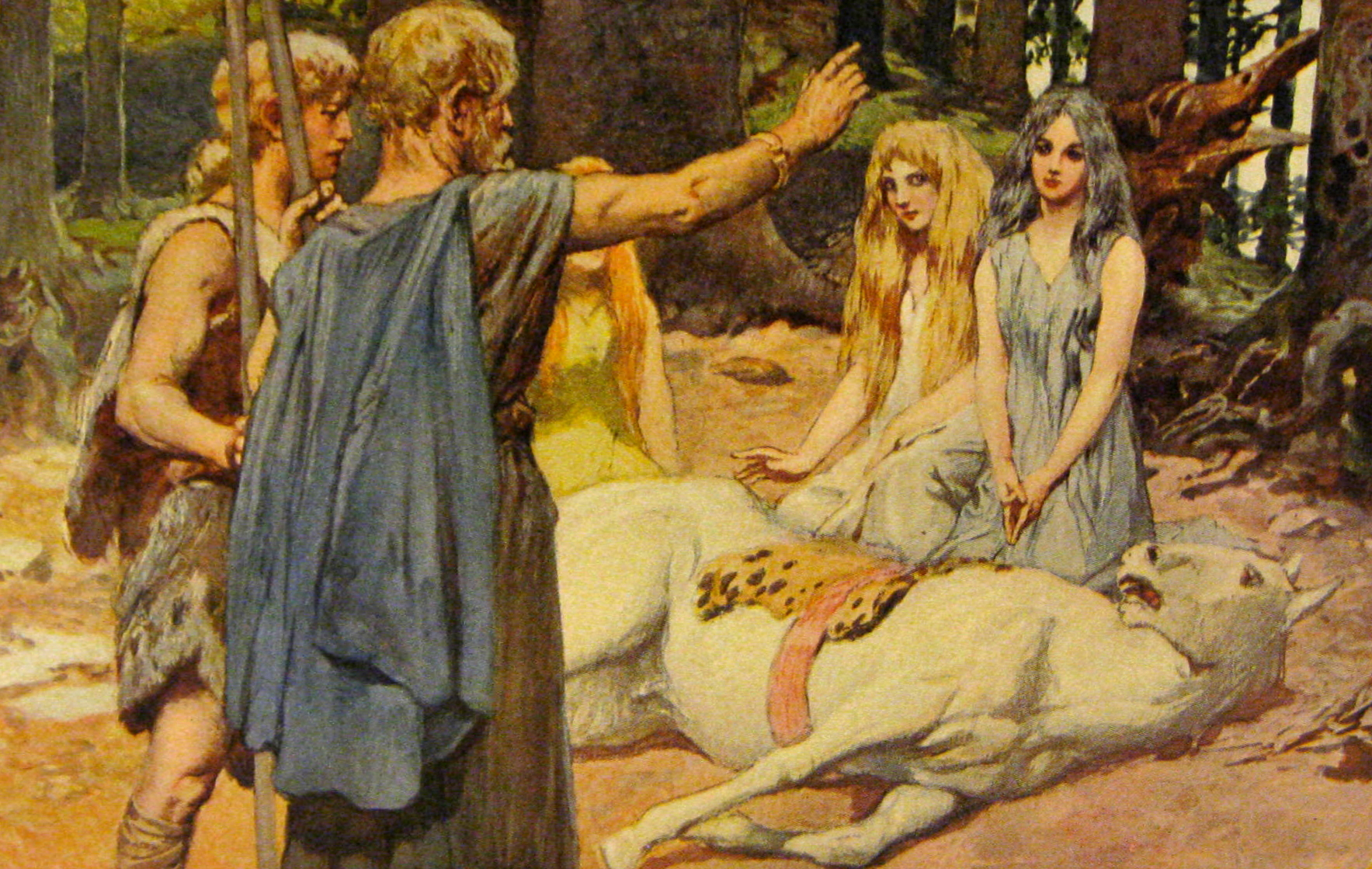
Odin Heals Balder's Horse by Emil Doepler, 1905

A 10th-century manuscript found in Merseburg, Germany, features a heathen invocation known as the Second Merseburg Incantation, which calls upon Odin and other gods and goddesses from the continental Germanic pantheon to assist in healing a horse:

Phol ende uuodan uuoran zi holza.
du uuart demo balderes uolon sin uuoz birenkit.
thu biguol en sinthgunt, sunna era suister,
thu biguol en friia, uolla era suister
thu biguol en uuodan, so he uuola conda:
sose benrenki, sose bluotrenki, sose lidirenki:
ben zi bena, bluot si bluoda,
lid zi geliden, sose gelimida sin!

Translation:

Phol and Woden travelled to the forest.
Then was for Baldur's foal its foot wrenched.
Then encharmed it Sindgund (and) Sunna her sister,
then encharmed it Frija (and) Volla her sister,
then encharmed it Woden, as he the best could,
As the bone-wrench, so for the blood wrench, (and) so the limb-wrench
bone to bone, blood to blood,
limb to limb, so be glued.

— Bill Griffiths translation

=== In Old English pedigrees ===
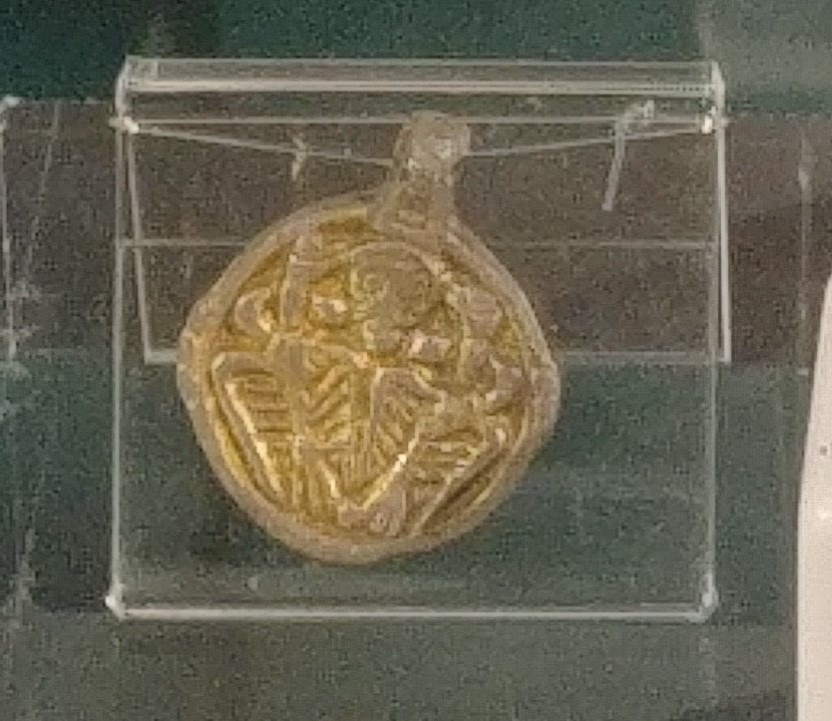
Pendant from Winteringham showing a man embracing two ravens

Old English royal genealogies record Woden as an ancestor of the kings of Lindsey, Mercia, Deira and Bernicia (which eventually became Northumbria, Wessex, and East Anglia), accounting for in 7 of the 8 genealogies, and all but Essex, who instead traced their ancestry to Saxnot. Some of these genealogies expand on ancestry beyond Woden, giving his father as Frealaf beginning in the 8th century.

The Welsh 9th-century Historia Brittonum also includes Woden in its pedigree of Hengist, and shows Woden's ancestry as "VVoden, filii Frealaf, filii Fredulf, filii Finn, filii Fodepald, filii Geta", who is said to be the son of a god other than Yahweh. This lines up with the Lindsey genealogy which says that Frealaf was the son of Friothulf, son of Finn, son of Godulf, son of Geat, although Nennius seems to have replaced Godulf with Fodepald. Other genealogies of Odin include further ancestry beyond Geat, giving Geat's father as Tætwa son of Beaw son of Sceldi son of Heremod son of Itermon son of Hathra son of Guala son of Bedwig son of Sceaf, who is the son of Noah from the Bible.

=== Viking Age to post-Viking Age ===
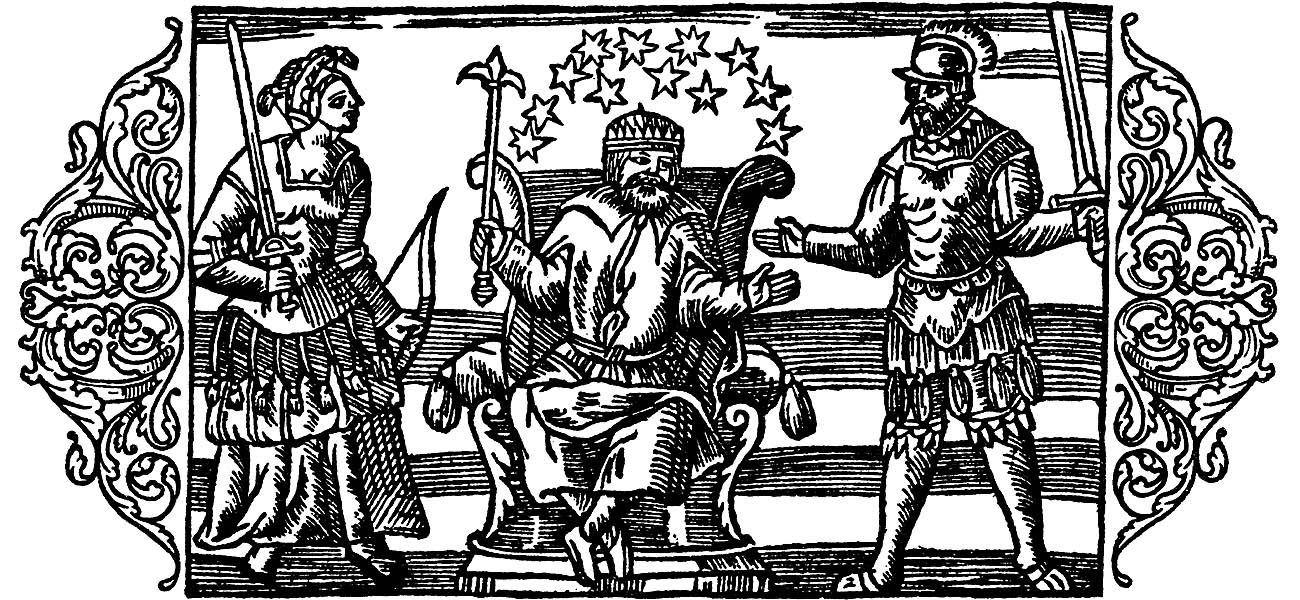
A 16th-century depiction of Norse deities by Olaus Magnus: from left to right, Frigg, Odin, and Thor

In the 11th century, chronicler Adam of Bremen recorded in a scholion of his Gesta Hammaburgensis Ecclesiae Pontificum that a statue of Thor, whom Adam describes as "mightiest", sat enthroned in the Temple at Uppsala (located in Gamla Uppsala, Sweden) flanked by Wodan (Odin) and "Fricco". Regarding Odin, Adam defines him as "frenzy" (Wodan, id est furor) and says that he "rules war and gives people strength against the enemy" and that the people of the temple depict him as wearing armour, "as our people depict Mars". According to Adam, the people of Uppsala had appointed priests (gothi) to each of the gods, who were to offer up sacrifices (blót), and in times of war sacrifices were made to images of Odin.

In the 12th century, centuries after Norway was "officially" Christianised, Odin was still being invoked by the population, as evidenced by a stick bearing a runic message found among the Bryggen inscriptions in Bergen, Norway. On the stick, both Thor and Odin are called upon for help; Thor is asked to "receive" the reader, and Odin to "own" them.

==== Poetic Edda ====
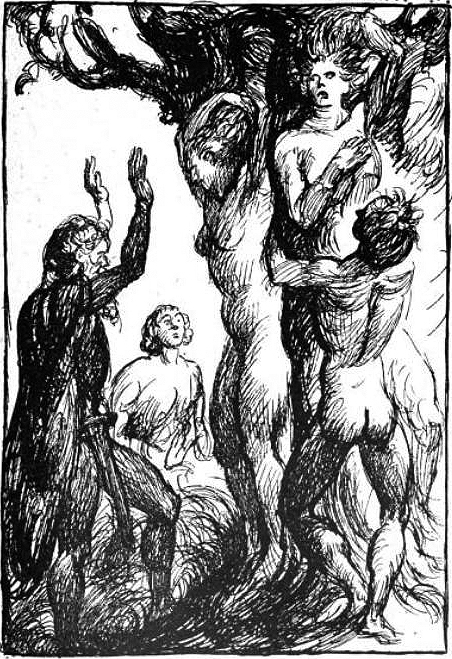
The trio of gods giving life to the first humans, Ask and Embla, by Robert Engels, 1919.

Odin is mentioned or appears in most poems of the Poetic Edda, compiled in the 13th century from traditional source material reaching back to the pagan period.

The poem Völuspá features Odin in a dialogue with an undead völva, who gives him wisdom from ages past and foretells the onset of Ragnarök, the destruction and rebirth of the world. Among the information the völva recounts is the story of the first human beings (Ask and Embla), found and given life by a trio of gods; Odin, Hœnir, and Lóðurr: In stanza 17 of the Poetic Edda poem Völuspá, the völva reciting the poem states that Hœnir, Lóðurr and Odin once found Ask and Embla on land. The völva says that the two were capable of very little, lacking in ørlög and says that they were given three gifts by the three gods:

Ǫnd þau né átto, óð þau né hǫfðo, lá né læti né lito góða. Ǫnd gaf Óðinn, óð gaf Hœnir, lá gaf Lóðurr ok lito góða. Old Norse:	Spirit they possessed not, sense they had not, blood nor motive powers, nor goodly colour. Spirit gave Odin, sense gave Hœnir, blood gave Lodur, and goodly colour. Benjamin Thorpe translation:	Soul they had not, sense they had not, Heat nor motion, nor goodly hue; Soul gave Othin, sense gave Hönir, Heat gave Lothur and goodly hue. Henry Adams Bellows translation:

The meaning of these gifts has been a matter of scholarly disagreement and translations therefore vary.

Later in the poem, the völva recounts the events of the Æsir–Vanir War, the war between Vanir and the Æsir, two groups of gods. During this, the first war of the world, Odin flung his spear into the opposing forces of the Vanir. The völva tells Odin that she knows where he has hidden his eye; in the spring Mímisbrunnr, and from it "Mímir drinks mead every morning". After Odin gives her necklaces, she continues to recount more information, including a list of valkyries, referred to as nǫnnor Herians 'the ladies of War Lord'; in other words, the ladies of Odin. In foretelling the events of Ragnarök, the völva predicts the death of Odin; Odin will fight the monstrous wolf Fenrir during the great battle at Ragnarök. Odin will be consumed by the wolf, yet Odin's son Víðarr will avenge him by stabbing the wolf in the heart. After the world is burned and renewed, the surviving and returning gods will meet and recall Odin's deeds and "ancient runes".

Odin sacrificing himself upon Yggdrasil as depicted by Lorenz Frølich, 1895

The poem Hávamál (Old Norse 'Sayings of the High One') consists entirely of wisdom verse attributed to Odin. This advice ranges from the practical ("A man shouldn't hold onto the cup but drink in moderation, it's necessary to speak or be silent; no man will blame you for impoliteness if you go early to bed"), to the mythological (such as Odin's recounting of his retrieval of Óðrœrir, the vessel containing the mead of poetry), and to the mystical (the final section of the poem consists of Odin's recollection of eighteen charms). Among the various scenes that Odin recounts is his self-sacrifice:

I know that I hung on a wind-rocked tree, nine whole nights, with a spear wounded, and to Odin offered, myself to myself; on that tree, of which no one knows from what root it springs. Bread no one gave me, nor a horn of drink, downward I peered, to runes applied myself, wailing learnt them, then fell down thence. Benjamin Thorpe translation:	I ween that I hung on the windy tree, Hung there for nine nights full nine; With the spear I was wounded, and offered I was, To Othin, myself to myself, On the tree that none may know What root beneath it runs. None made me happy with a loaf or horn, And there below I looked; I took up the runes, shrieking I took them, And forthwith back I fell. Henry Adams Bellows translation:	I know that I hung on a windy tree nine long nights, wounded with a spear, dedicated to Odin, myself to myself, on that tree of which no man knows from where its roots run. No bread did they give me nor a drink from a horn, downwards I peered; I took up the runes, screaming I took them, then I fell back from there. Carolyne Larrington translation:

While the name of the tree is not provided in the poem and other trees exist in Norse mythology, the tree is near universally accepted as the cosmic tree Yggdrasil, and if the tree is Yggdrasil, then the name Yggdrasil (Old Norse 'Ygg's steed') directly relates to this story. Odin is associated with hanging and gallows; John Lindow comments that "the hanged 'ride' the gallows".

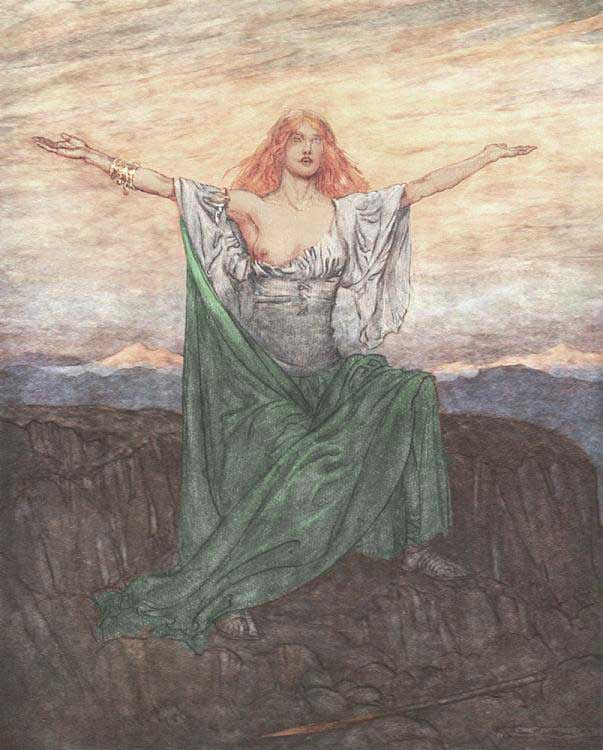
After being put to sleep by Odin and being awoken by the hero Sigurd, the valkyrie Sigrdrífa says a pagan prayer; illustration (1911) by Arthur Rackham.

In the prose introduction to the poem Sigrdrífumál, the hero Sigurd rides up to Hindarfell and heads south towards "the land of the Franks". On the mountain Sigurd sees a great light, "as if fire were burning, which blazed up to the sky". Sigurd approaches it, and there he sees a skjaldborg (a tactical formation of shield wall) with a banner flying overhead. Sigurd enters the skjaldborg, and sees a warrior lying there—asleep and fully armed. Sigurd removes the helmet of the warrior, and sees the face of a woman. The woman's corslet is so tight that it seems to have grown into the woman's body. Sigurd uses his sword Gram to cut the corslet, starting from the neck of the corslet downwards, he continues cutting down her sleeves, and takes the corslet off her.

The woman wakes, sits up, looks at Sigurd, and the two converse in two stanzas of verse. In the second stanza, the woman explains that Odin placed a sleeping spell on her which she could not break, and due to that spell she has been asleep a long time. Sigurd asks for her name, and the woman gives Sigurd a horn of mead to help him retain her words in his memory. The woman recites a heathen prayer in two stanzas. A prose narrative explains that the woman is named Sigrdrífa and that she is a valkyrie.

A narrative relates that Sigrdrífa explains to Sigurd that there were two kings fighting one another. Odin had promised one of these—Hjalmgunnar—victory in battle, yet she had "brought down" Hjalmgunnar in battle. Odin pricked her with a sleeping-thorn in consequence, told her that she would never again "fight victoriously in battle", and condemned her to marriage. In response, Sigrdrífa told Odin she had sworn a great oath that she would never wed a man who knew fear. Sigurd asks Sigrdrífa to share with him her wisdom of all worlds. The poem continues in verse, where Sigrdrífa provides Sigurd with knowledge in inscribing runes, mystic wisdom, and prophecy.

==== Prose Edda ====
Odin is mentioned throughout the books of the Prose Edda, composed in the 13th century and drawing from earlier traditional material. The god is introduced at length in chapter nine of the Prose Edda book Gylfaginning, which explains that he is described as ruling over Asgard, the domain of the gods, on his throne, that he is the 'father of all', and that from him all the gods, all of humankind (by way of Ask and Embla), and everything else he has made or produced. According to Gylfaginning, in Asgard:

There the gods and their descendants lived and there took place as a result many developments both on earth and aloft. In the city there is a seat called Hlidskialf, and when Odin sat in that throne he saw over all worlds and every man's activity and understood everything he saw. His wife was called Frigg Fiorgvin's daughter, and from them is descended the family line that we call the Æsir race, who have resided in Old Asgard and the realms that belong to it, and that whole line of descent is of divine origin. And this is why he can be called All-father, that he is father of all gods and of men and of everything that has been brought into being by him and his power. The earth was his daughter and his wife. Out of her he begot the first of his ons, that is Asa-Thor.

In the Prose Edda book Gylfaginning (chapter 38), the enthroned figure of High (Harr), tells Gangleri (king Gylfi in disguise) that two ravens named Huginn and Muninn sit on Odin's shoulders. The ravens tell Odin everything they see and hear. Odin sends Huginn and Muninn out at dawn, and the birds fly all over the world before returning at dinner-time. As a result, Odin is kept informed of many events. High adds that it is from this association that Odin is referred to as "raven-god". The above-mentioned stanza from Grímnismál is then quoted.

In the same chapter, the enthroned figure of High explains that Odin gives all of the food on his table to his wolves Geri and Freki and that Odin requires no food, for wine is to him both meat and drink.

==== Heimskringla and sagas ====
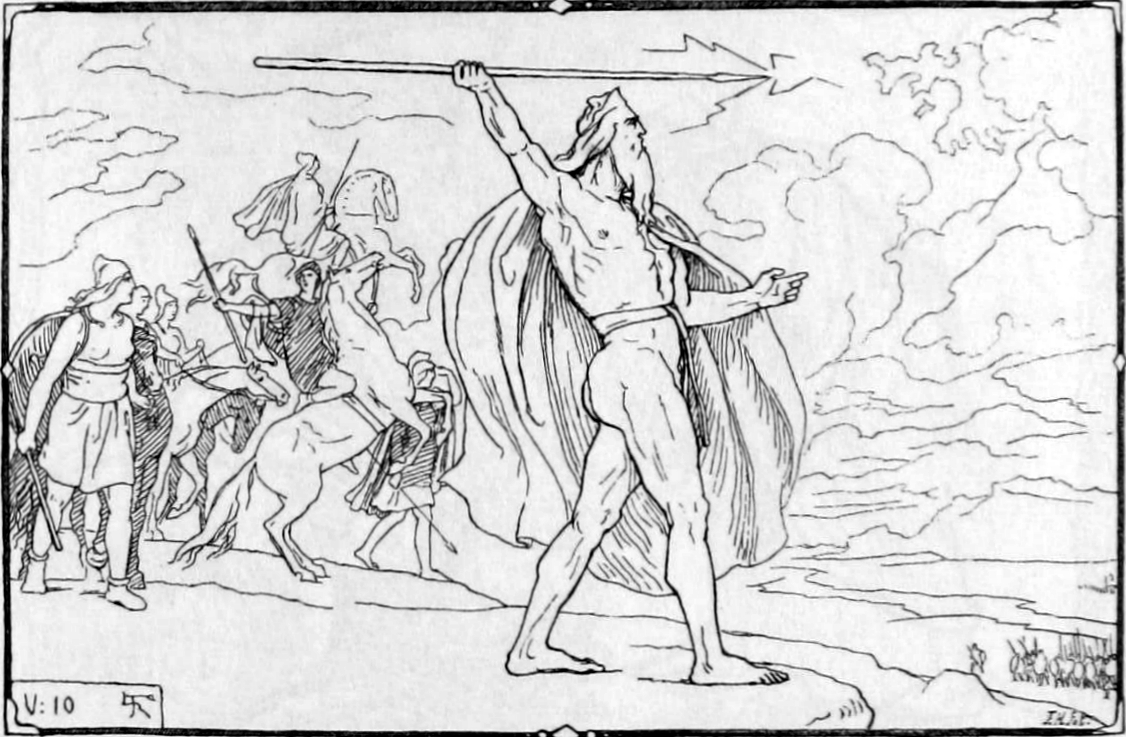
Odin throws his spear at the Vanir host in an illustration by Lorenz Frølich (1895)

Odin is mentioned several times in the sagas that make up Heimskringla. In the Ynglinga saga, the first section of Heimskringla, an euhemerised account of the origin of the gods is provided. Odin is introduced in chapter two, where he is said to have lived in "the land or home of the Æsir" (Old Norse: Ásaland eða Ásaheimr), the capital of which being Ásgarðr. Ásgarðr was ruled by Odin, a great chieftain, and was "a great place for sacrifices". It was the custom there that 12 temple priests were ranked highest; they administered sacrifices and held judgements over men. "Called diar or chiefs", the people were obliged to serve under them and respect them. Odin was a very successful warrior and travelled widely, conquering many lands. Odin was so successful that he never lost a battle. As a result, according to the saga, men came to believe that "it was granted to him" to win all battles. Before Odin sent his men to war or to perform tasks for him, he would place his hands upon their heads and give them a bjannak ('blessing', ultimately from Latin benedictio) and the men would believe that they would also prevail. The men placed all of their faith in Odin, and wherever they called his name they would receive assistance from doing so. Odin was often gone for great spans of time.

Chapter 3 says that Odin had two brothers, Vé and Vili. While Odin was gone, his brothers governed his realm. Once Odin was gone for so long that the Æsir believed that he would not return, his brothers began to divvy up Odin's inheritance, "but his wife Frigg they shared between them. However, afterwards, [Odin] returned and took possession of his wife again". Chapter 4 describes the Æsir–Vanir War. According to the chapter, Odin "made war on the Vanir". The Vanir defended their land and the battle turned to a stalemate, both sides having devastated each other's lands. As part of a peace agreement, the two sides exchanged hostages. One of the exchanges went awry and resulted in the Vanir decapitating one of the hostages sent to them by the Æsir, Mímir. The Vanir sent Mímir's head to the Æsir, whereupon Odin "took it and embalmed it with herbs so that it would not rot, and spoke charms [Old Norse galdr] over it", which imbued the head with the ability to answer Odin and "tell him many occult things".

In Völsunga saga, the great king Rerir and his wife (unnamed) are unable to conceive a child; "that lack displeased them both, and they fervently implored the gods that they might have a child. It is said that Frigg heard their prayers and told Odin what they asked", and the two gods subsequently sent a Valkyrie to present Rerir an apple that falls onto his lap while he sits on a burial mound and Rerir's wife subsequently becomes pregnant with the namesake of the Völsung family line.

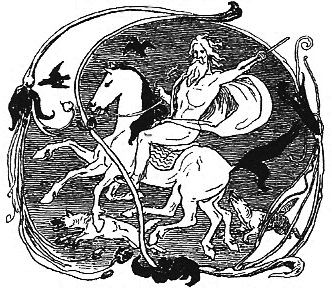
Odin sits atop his steed Sleipnir, his ravens Huginn and Muninn and wolves Geri and Freki nearby (1895) by Lorenz Frølich.

In the 13th-century legendary saga Hervarar saga ok Heiðreks, one of the riddles of Gestumblindi mentions Sleipnir and Odin:

36. Gestumblindi said:
Who are the twain
that on ten feet run?
three eyes they have,
but only one tail.
All right guess now
this riddle, Heithrek!

Heithrek said:
Good is thy riddle, Gestumblindi,
and guessed it is:
that is Odin riding on Sleipnir.

=== Modern folklore ===
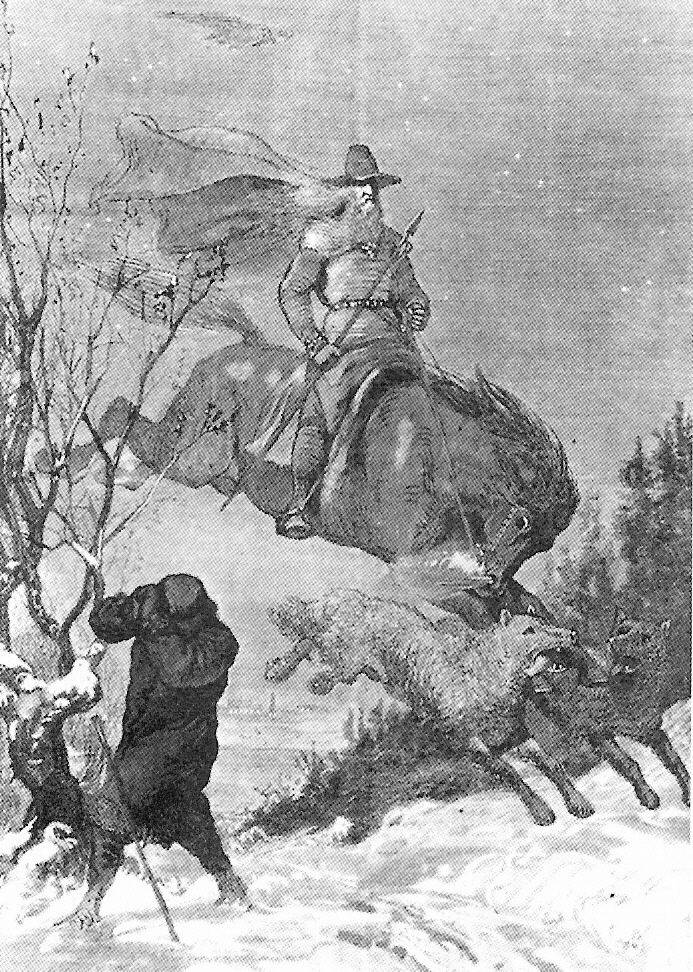
Odin's hunt (August Malmström)

Local folklore and folk practice recognised Odin as late as the 19th century in Scandinavia. In a work published in the mid-19th century, Benjamin Thorpe records that on Gotland, "many traditions and stories of Odin the Old still live in the mouths of the people". Thorpe notes that, in Blekinge in Sweden, "it was formerly the custom to leave a sheaf on the field for Odin's horses", and cites other examples, such as in Kråktorpsgård, Småland, where a barrow was purported to have been opened in the 18th century, purportedly containing the body of Odin. After Christianization, the mound was known as Helvetesbackke (Swedish "Hell's Mound"). Local legend dictates that after it was opened, "there burst forth a wondrous fire, like a flash of lightning", and that a coffin full of flint and a lamp were excavated. Thorpe additionally relates that legend has it that a priest who dwelt around Troienborg had once sowed some rye, and that when the rye sprang up, so came Odin riding from the hills each evening. Odin was so massive that he towered over the farm-yard buildings, spear in hand. Halting before the entry way, he kept all from entering or leaving all night, which occurred every night until the rye was cut.

Thorpe relates that "a story is also current of a golden ship, which is said to be sunk in Runemad, near the Nyckelberg, in which, according to tradition, Odin fetched the slain from the battle of Bråvalla to Valhall", and that Kettilsås, according to legend, derives its name from "one Ketill Runske, who stole Odin's runic staves" (runekaflar) and then bound Odin's dogs, bull, and a mermaid who came to help Odin. Thorpe notes that numerous other traditions existed in Sweden at the time of his writing.

Thorpe records (1851) that in Sweden, "when a noise, like that of carriages and horses, is heard by night, the people say: 'Odin is passing by'".

Odin and the gods Loki and Hœnir help a farmer and a boy escape the wrath of a bet-winning jötunn in Loka Táttur or Lokka Táttur, a Faroese ballad dating to the Late Middle Ages.

== Archaeological record ==
References to or depictions of Odin appear on numerous objects. Migration Period (5th and 6th century CE) gold bracteates (types A, B, and C) feature a depiction of a human figure above a horse, holding a spear and flanked by one or two birds. The presence of the birds has led to the iconographic identification of the human figure as the god Odin, flanked by Huginn and Muninn. Like the Prose Edda description of the ravens, a bird is sometimes depicted at the ear of the human, or at the ear of the horse. Bracteates have been found in Denmark, Sweden, Norway and, in smaller numbers, England and areas south of Denmark. Austrian Germanist Rudolf Simek states that these bracteates may depict Odin and his ravens healing a horse and may indicate that the birds were originally not simply his battlefield companions but also "Odin's helpers in his veterinary function."

Vendel Period helmet plates (from the 6th or 7th century) found in a grave in Sweden depict a helmeted figure holding a spear and a shield while riding a horse, flanked by two birds. The plate has been interpreted as Odin accompanied by two birds; his ravens.

Two of the 8th century picture stones from the island of Gotland, Sweden depict eight-legged horses, which are thought by most scholars to depict Sleipnir: the Tjängvide image stone and the Ardre VIII image stone. Both stones feature a rider sitting atop an eight-legged horse, which some scholars view as Odin. Above the rider on the Tjängvide image stone is a horizontal figure holding a spear, which may be a valkyrie, and a female figure greets the rider with a cup. The scene has been interpreted as a rider arriving at the world of the dead. The mid-7th century Eggja stone bearing the Odinic name haras (Old Norse 'army god') may be interpreted as depicting Sleipnir.

A pair of identical Germanic Iron Age bird-shaped brooches from Bejsebakke in northern Denmark may be depictions of Huginn and Muninn. The back of each bird features a mask-motif, and the feet of the birds are shaped like the heads of animals. The feathers of the birds are also composed of animal-heads. Together, the animal-heads on the feathers form a mask on the back of the bird. The birds have powerful beaks and fan-shaped tails, indicating that they are ravens. The brooches were intended to be worn on each shoulder, after Germanic Iron Age fashion. Archaeologist Peter Vang Petersen comments that while the symbolism of the brooches is open to debate, the shape of the beaks and tail feathers confirms the brooch depictions are ravens. Petersen notes that "raven-shaped ornaments worn as a pair, after the fashion of the day, one on each shoulder, makes one's thoughts turn towards Odin's ravens and the cult of Odin in the Germanic Iron Age." Petersen says that Odin is associated with disguise, and that the masks on the ravens may be portraits of Odin.

The Oseberg tapestry fragments, discovered within the Viking Age Oseberg ship burial in Norway, features a scene containing two black birds hovering over a horse, possibly originally leading a wagon (as a part of a procession of horse-led wagons on the tapestry). In her examination of the tapestry, scholar Anne Stine Ingstad interprets these birds as Huginn and Muninn flying over a covered cart containing an image of Odin, drawing comparison to the images of Nerthus attested by Tacitus in 1 CE.

Excavations in Ribe, Denmark have recovered a Viking Age lead metal-caster's mould and 11 identical casting-moulds. These objects depict a moustached man wearing a helmet that features two head-ornaments. Archaeologist Stig Jensen proposes these head-ornaments should be interpreted as Huginn and Muninn, and the wearer as Odin. He notes that "similar depictions occur everywhere the Vikings went—from eastern England to Russia and naturally also in the rest of Scandinavia."

A portion of Thorwald's Cross (a partly surviving runestone erected at Kirk Andreas on the Isle of Man) depicts a bearded human holding a spear downward at a wolf, his right foot in its mouth, and a large bird on his shoulder. Andy Orchard comments that this bird may be either Huginn or Muninn. Rundata dates the cross to 940, while Pluskowski dates it to the 11th century. This depiction has been interpreted as Odin, with a raven or eagle at his shoulder, being consumed by the monstrous wolf Fenrir during the events of Ragnarök.

The 11th century Ledberg stone in Sweden, similarly to Thorwald's Cross, features a figure with his foot at the mouth of a four-legged beast, and this may also be a depiction of Odin being devoured by Fenrir at Ragnarök. Below the beast and the man is a depiction of a legless, helmeted man, with his arms in a prostrate position. The Younger Futhark inscription on the stone bears a commonly seen memorial dedication, but is followed by an encoded runic sequence that has been described as "mysterious," and "an interesting magic formula which is known from all over the ancient Norse world."

In November 2009, the Roskilde Museum announced the discovery and subsequent display of a niello-inlaid silver figurine found in Lejre, which they dubbed Odin from Lejre. The silver object depicts a person sitting on a throne. The throne features the heads of animals and is flanked by two birds. The Roskilde Museum identifies the figure as Odin sitting on his throne Hliðskjálf, flanked by the ravens Huginn and Muninn.

Various interpretations have been offered for a symbol that appears on various archaeological finds known modernly as the valknut. Due to the context of its placement on some objects, some scholars have interpreted this symbol as referring to Odin. For example, Hilda Ellis Davidson theorises a connection between the valknut, the god Odin and "mental binds":

For instance, beside the figure of Odin on his horse shown on several memorial stones there is a kind of knot depicted, called the valknut, related to the triskele. This is thought to symbolize the power of the god to bind and unbind, mentioned in the poems and elsewhere. Odin had the power to lay bonds upon the mind, so that men became helpless in battle, and he could also loosen the tensions of fear and strain by his gifts of battle-madness, intoxication, and inspiration.

Davidson says that similar symbols are found beside figures of wolves and ravens on "certain cremation urns" from Anglo-Saxon cemeteries in East Anglia. According to Davidson, Odin's connection to cremation is known, and it does not seem unreasonable to connect with Odin in Anglo-Saxon England. Davidson proposes further connections between Odin's role as bringer of ecstasy by way of the etymology of the god's name.

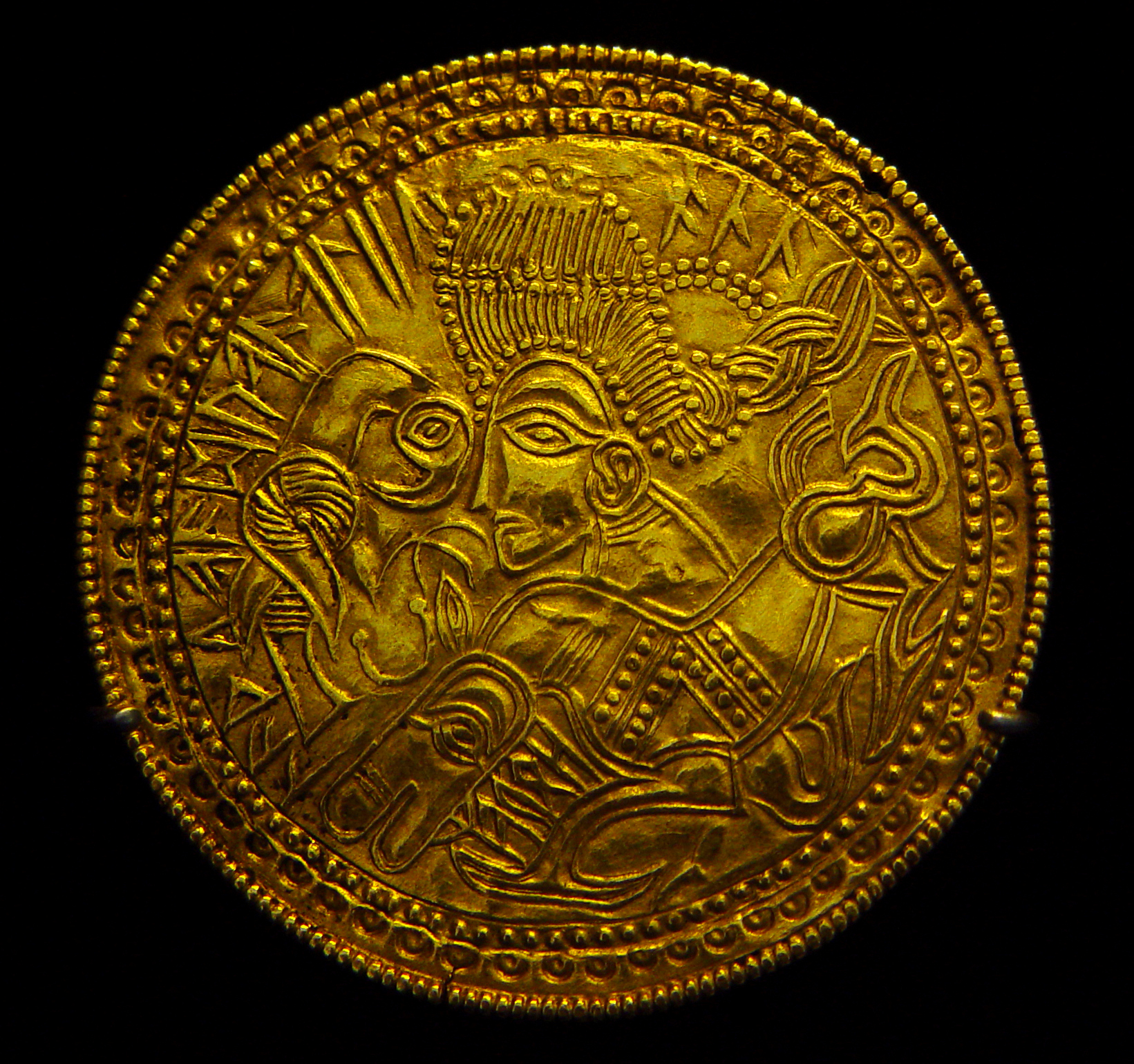
A C-type bracteate (DR BR42) featuring a figure above a horse flanked by a bird

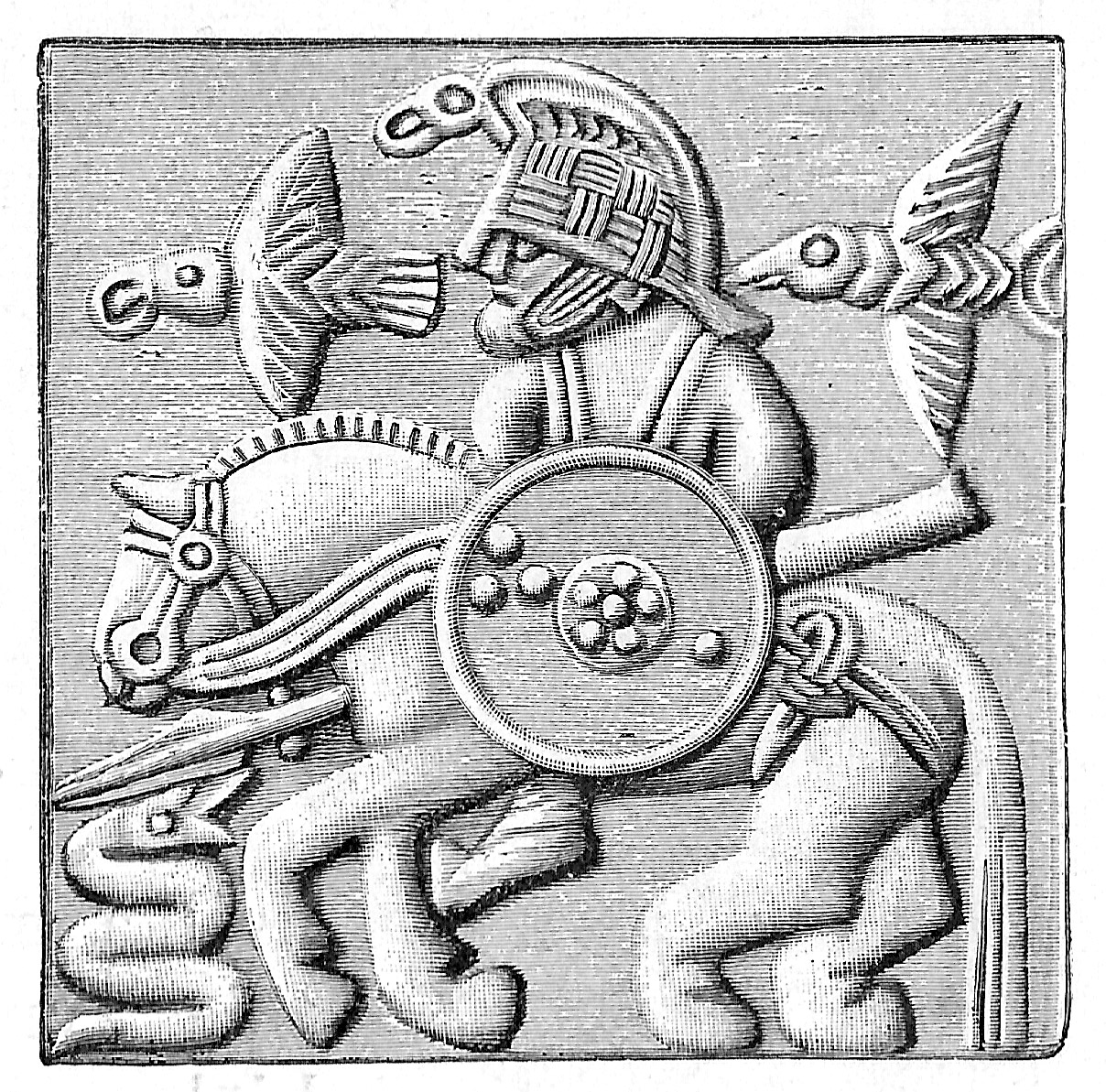
A plate from a Swedish Vendel era helmet featuring a figure riding a horse, accompanied by two ravens, holding a spear and shield, and confronted by a serpent

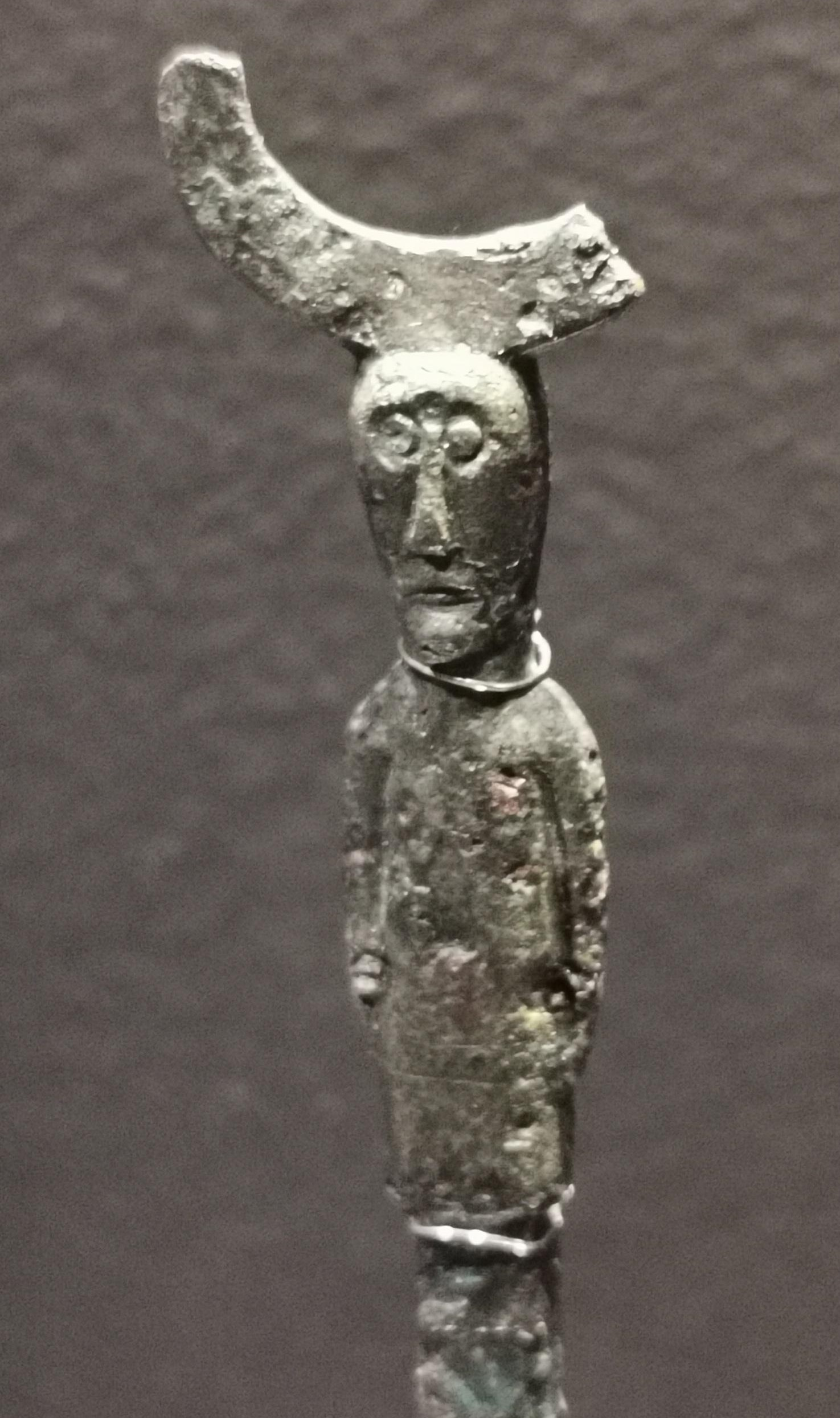
Figurine believed to be a representation of Odin found at the Uppåkra temple

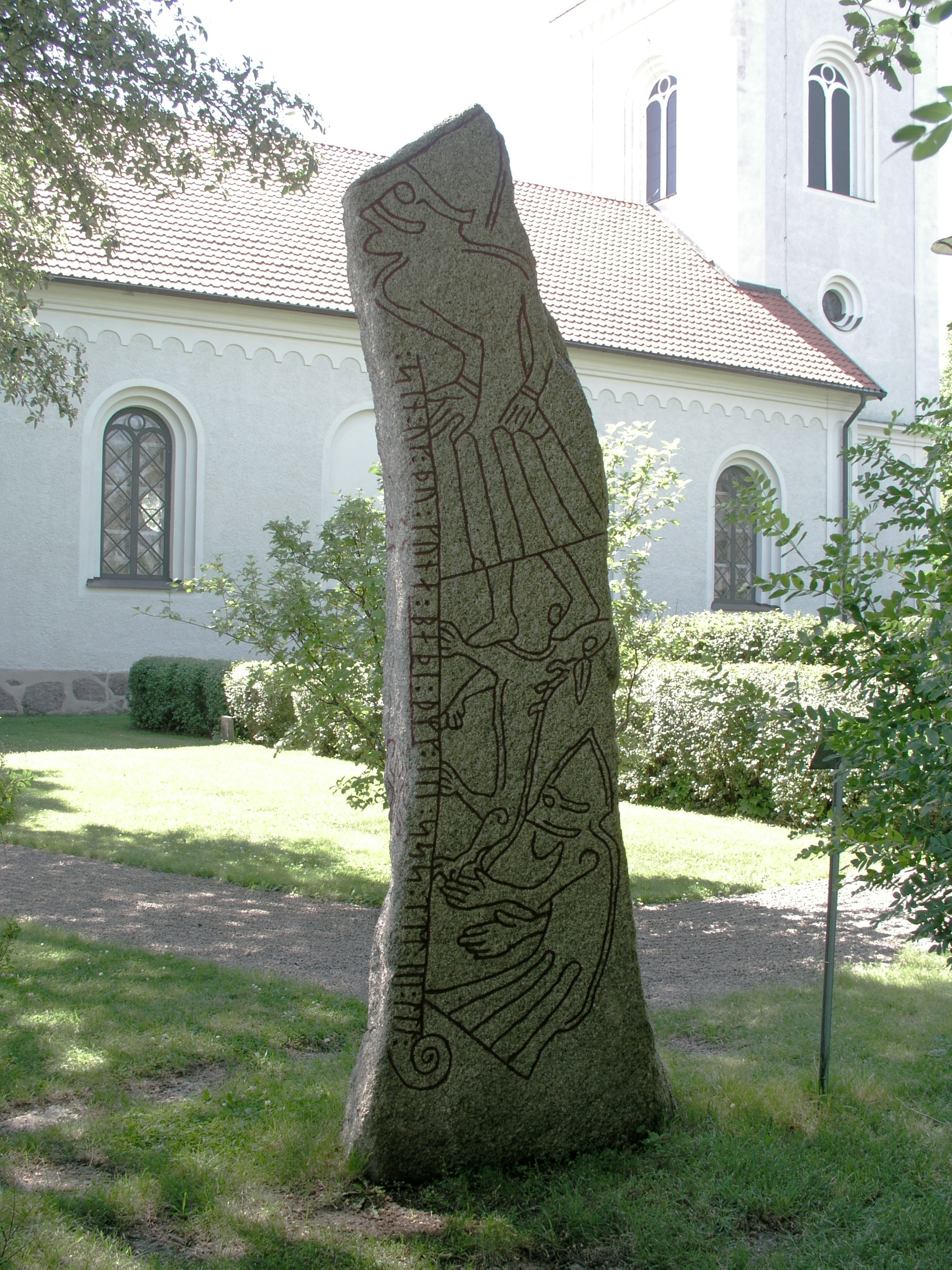
The Ledberg stone at Ledberg Church, Östergötland, Sweden

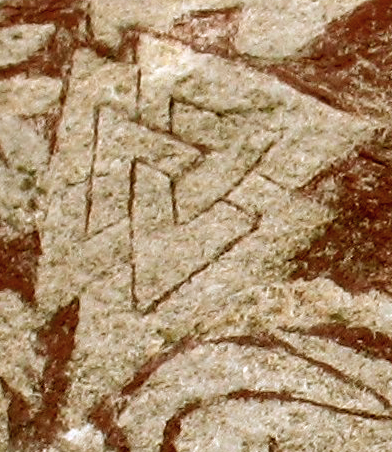
Valknut on the Stora Hammars I stone

== Origin and theories ==
Beginning with Henry Petersen's doctoral dissertation in 1876, which proposed that Thor was the indigenous god of Scandinavian farmers and Odin a later god proper to chieftains and poets, many scholars of Norse mythology in the past viewed Odin as having been imported from elsewhere. The idea was expanded upon by Bernhard Salin on the basis of motifs in the petroglyphs and bracteates, and with reference to the Prologue of the Prose Edda, which presents the Æsir as having migrated into Scandinavia. Salin proposed that both Odin and the runes were introduced from Southeastern Europe in the Iron Age. Other scholars placed his introduction at different times; Axel Olrik, during the Migration Age as a result of Gaulish influence.

More radically, both the archaeologist and comparative mythologist Marija Gimbutas and the Germanicist Karl Helm argued that the Æsir as a group, which includes both Thor and Odin, were late introductions into Northern Europe and that the indigenous religion of the region had been Vanic.

In the 16th century and by the entire Vasa dynasty, Odin (Swedish: Oden) was officially considered the first king of Sweden by that country's government and historians. This was influenced by an embellished list of rulers invented by Johannes Magnus.

Under the trifunctional hypothesis of Georges Dumézil, Odin is assigned one of the core functions in the Indo-European pantheon as a representative of the first function (sovereignty) corresponding to the Hindu Varuṇa (fury and magic) as opposed to Týr, who corresponds to the Hindu Mitrá (law and justice); while the Vanir represent the third function (fertility).

Another approach to Odin has been in terms of his function and attributes. Many early scholars interpreted him as a wind-god or especially as a death-god. He has also been interpreted in the light of his association with ecstatic practices, and Jan de Vries compared him to the Hindu god Rudra and the Greek Hermes.

== Modern influence ==
The god Odin has been a source of inspiration for artists working in fine art, literature, and music. Fine art depictions of Odin in the modern period include the pen and ink drawing Odin byggande Sigtuna (1812) and the sketch King Gylfe receives Oden on his arrival to Sweden (1816) by Pehr Hörberg; the drinking horn relief Odens möte med Gylfe (1818), the marble statue Odin (1830) and the colossal bust Odin by Bengt Erland Fogelberg, the statues Odin (1812/1822) and Odin (1824/1825) by Hermann Ernst Freund, the sgraffito over the entrance of Villa Wahnfried in Bayreuth (1874) by R. Krausse, the painting Odin (around 1880) by Edward Burne-Jones, the drawing Thor und Magni (1883) by K. Ehrenberg, the marble statue Wodan (around 1887) by H. Natter, the oil painting Odin und Brunhilde (1890) by Konrad Dielitz, the graphic drawing Odin als Kriegsgott (1896) by Hans Thoma, the painting Odin and Fenris (around 1900) by Dorothy Hardy, the oil painting Wotan und Brünhilde (1914) by Koloman Moser, the painting The Road to Walhall by S. Nilsson, the wooden Oslo City Hall relief Odin og Mime (1938) and the coloured wooden relief in the courtyard of the Oslo City Hall Odin på Sleipnir (1945–1950) by Dagfin Werenskiold, and the bronze relief on the doors of the Swedish Museum of National Antiquities, Odin (1950) by Bror Marklund.

Works of modern literature featuring Odin include the poem Der Wein (1745) by Friedrich von Hagedorn, Hymne de Wodan (1769) by Friedrich Gottlieb Klopstock, Om Odin (1771) by Peter Frederik Suhm, the tragedy Odin eller Asarnes invandring by K. G. Leopold, the epic poem Odin eller Danrigets Stiftelse (1803) by Jens Baggesen, the poem Maskeradenball (1803) and Optrin af Norners og Asers Kamp: Odin komme til Norden (1809) by N. F. S. Grundtvig, poems in Nordens Guder (1819) by Adam Oehlenschläger, the four-part novel Sviavigamal (1833) by Carl Jonas Love Almqvist, "The Hero as Divinity" from On Heroes, Hero-Worship, & the Heroic in History (1841) by Thomas Carlyle, the poem Prelude (1850) by William Wordsworth, the poem Odins Meeresritt by Aloys Schreiber set to music by Karl Loewe (1851), the canzone Germanenzug (1864) by Robert Hamerling, the poem Zum 25. August 1870 (1870) by Richard Wagner, the ballad Rolf Krake (1910) by F. Schanz, the novel Juvikingerne (1918–1923) by Olav Duun, the comedy Der entfesselte Wotan (1923) by Ernst Toller, the novel Wotan by Karl Hans Strobl, Herrn Wodes Ausfahrt (1937) by Hans-Friedrich Blunck, the poem An das Ich (1938) by H. Burte, and the novel Sage vom Reich (1941–1942) by Hans-Friedrich Blunck.

Music inspired by or featuring the god includes the ballets Odins Schwert (1818) and Orfa (1852) by J. H. Stunz and the opera cycle Der Ring des Nibelungen (1848–1874) by Richard Wagner.

Odin was adapted as a character by Marvel Comics, first appearing in the Journey into Mystery series in 1962. Sir Anthony Hopkins portrayed the character in the Marvel Cinematic Universe films Thor (2011), Thor: The Dark World (2013), and Thor: Ragnarok (2017). He was also adapted in Neil Gaiman's 2001 novel American Gods as Mr. Wednesday, a con artist revealed to be an incarnation of Odin. The character was portrayed by Ian McShane in the television adaptation of the novel.

Odin is featured in a number of video games. In the 2002 Ensemble Studios game Age of Mythology, Odin is one of three major gods Norse players can worship. Odin is an unseen character in Santa Monica Studio's 2018 game God of War and appears in its 2022 sequel God of War Ragnarök as the primary antagonist. He is a major influence in the 2020 Ubisoft game Assassin's Creed Valhalla in the form of an Isu (a godlike, humanoid species within the Assassin's Creed universe) of the same name. The primary protagonist, Eivor, is revealed to be a human reincarnation of Odin, having inherited his memories and several genetic traits. Odin is also one of the playable gods in the third-person multiplayer online battle arena game Smite.

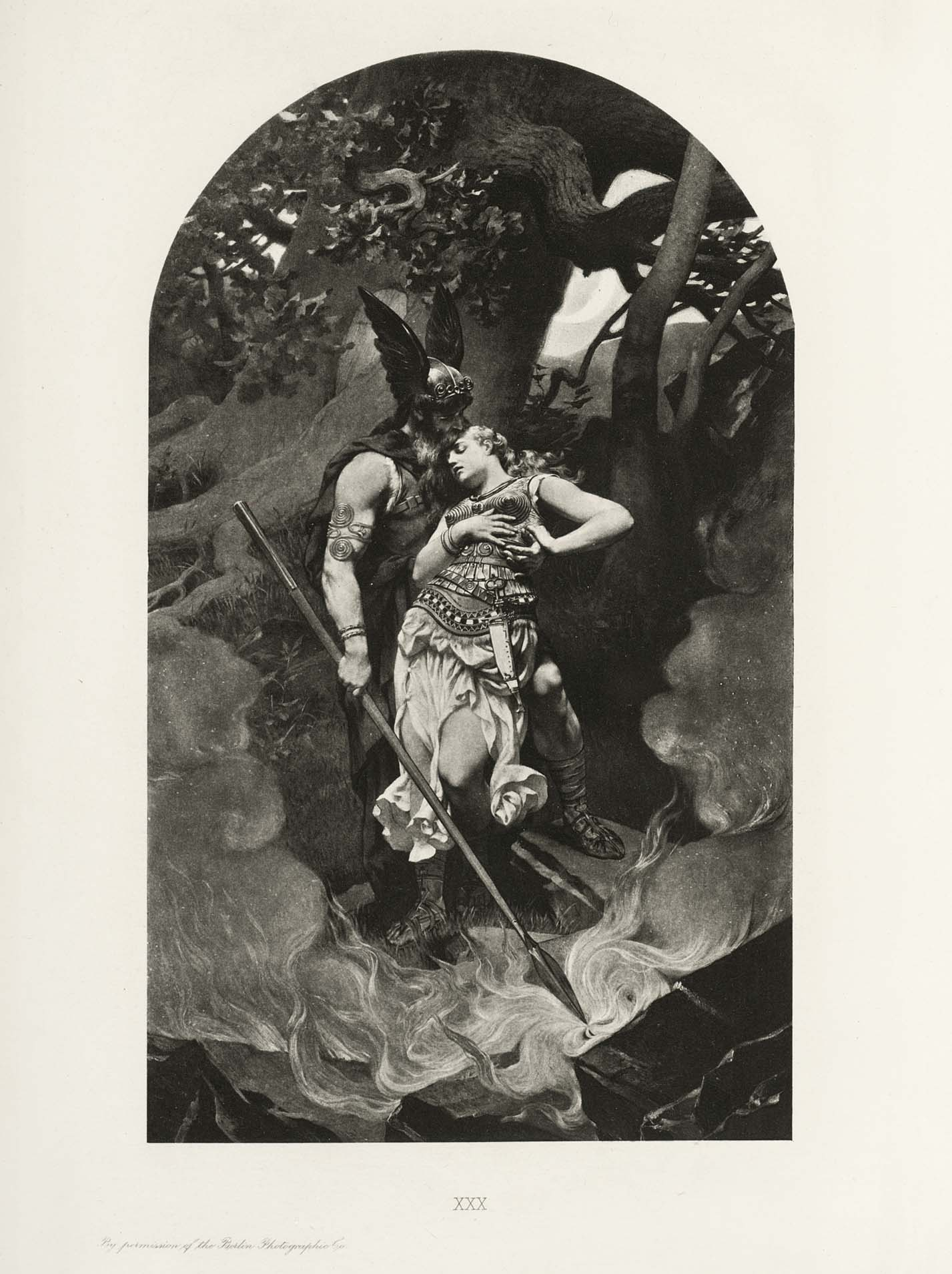
Wotan Takes Leave of Brunhild (1892) by Konrad Dielitz

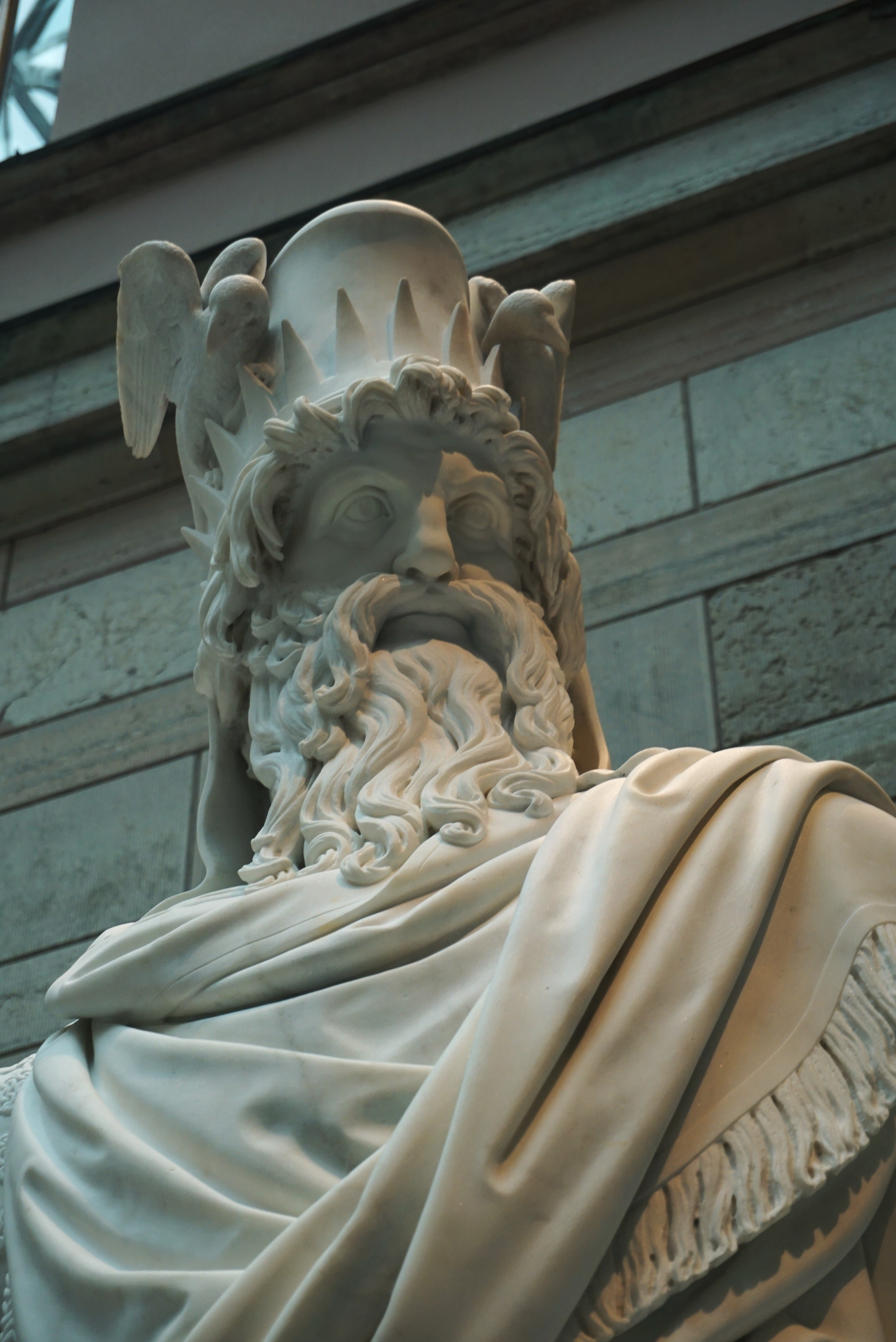
Oden, marble statue by Bengt Erland Fogelberg 1830, Nationalmuseum, Stockholm
