= Loka Táttur =

Faroese ballad

Loka Táttur or Lokka Táttur (tale, or þáttr of Loki) is a Faroese ballad (Corpus Carminum Færoensium 13D) which is an example of the occurrence of Norse gods in folklore.

The ballad probably dates back to the late Middle Ages. The story is a fairytale, but features the same trio of gods, Odin, Hœnir and Loki, as in the story of Þjazi in the Prose Edda, the prose introduction to the Eddic poem Reginsmál, and also the late Icelandic Huldar saga, which has contributed to the argument that Loki is the same as Lóðurr, who appears elsewhere with Odin and Hœnir. It is also notable that Loki is a benevolent god in this story, although his slyness is in evidence as usual. Some scholars, including V.U. Hammershaimb, who published a translation of the ballad in 1851, have pointed to the division of spheres between the three gods: Odin governing the skies and the crops they fertilise, Hœnir the seabirds and Loki the fishes, as reflecting the bases of Faroese life.

== Story ==
A farmer loses a bet with a giant, called Skrymir in some verses, who demands his son. The farmer asks first Odin, then Hœnir, and finally Loki or Lokki (Note: Note that 'kk' is pronounced [t͡ʃː ~ ʰt͡ʃ] in this instance, according to Faroese orthography, though not so pronounced in the genitive form Lokka.) for assistance. Odin has a field of grain grow up overnight and conceals the boy as one grain on an axe in the middle of the field. The boy is afraid because the giant's hand is brushing against the particular grain, but Odin calls him to him and returns him to his parents, telling them he has fulfilled the task.

Hœnir causes seven swans to fly over the sound; the boy is a feather in the middle of a swan's head. But the giant grabs one swan and wrenches its head from its body, and the boy is afraid because the particular feather is protruding from the giant's mouth. Hœnir calls him to him and brings him back, and his work is over. Loki instructs the farmer to build a boathouse with a wide opening and to affix an iron stake to it. Then he goes to the beach, where a boat is riding at anchor, rows out to sea, casts a weighted hook to the bottom, and catches a flounder. He has the boy be a grain in the middle of the fish's roe. The giant is waiting on the beach for Loki, asking him where he has been all night. He tells him he has had little rest, rowing all about the sea, and they go out together to fish. The giant casts his line and catches three flounders; the third is black, and Loki asks him to give him that fish. The giant refuses, and begins to count the roe, thinking to find the boy in one grain. The boy is afraid, because the particular grain is squeezing out of the giant's hand.

Loki calls him to him and tells him to sit behind him and not let the giant see him and when they reach shore, to jump onto the beach so lightly that he does not make a mark in the sand. As the giant is pulling the boat onto the land, the boy jumps out and is standing before him; the giant pursues him but sinks in the sand up to his knees. The boy runs as fast as he can into his father's boathouse; the giant, in hot pursuit, sticks fast in the opening; the iron stake goes into his head. Loki cuts off one of his legs, but the wound grows together at once; he cuts off the other, this time throwing sticks and stones into the gap, and the wound does not grow together. Loki takes the boy home to his parents and says that he has done the job asked of him; the giant is dead.

== Publication history ==
The Danish botanist and clergyman Hans Christian Lyngbye published the first edition of Lokka Táttur and other Faroese ballads in 1822, in phonetically spelt Faroese with a facing-page translation into Danish (with the assistance of Jens Christian Svabo). A prose Danish translation was published by V.U. Hammershaimb in 1851 in Færöiske Kvæder. Lyngbye preceded Loka Táttur with Skrímsla (Corpus Carminum Færoensium 90C), which appears to tell the earlier part of the story. It calls the monster "skrímsli" and specifies that the bet was on a chess game.
