= Vé (shrine) =

Shrine or sacred place in Germanic paganism

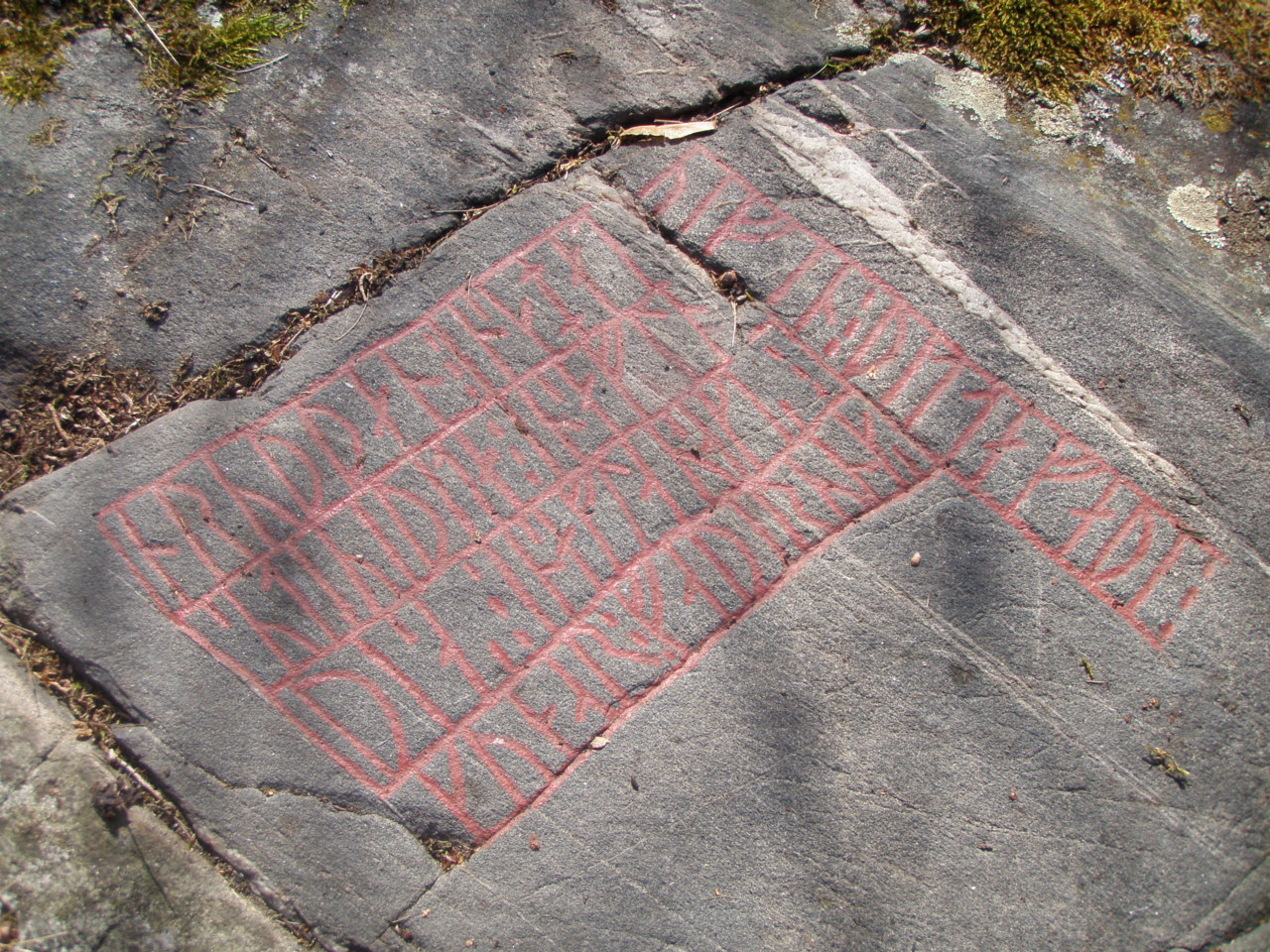
The 9th century Oklunda inscription, recording how a man obtained sanctuary at a vé after committing a crime, probably a homicide.

In Germanic paganism, a vé (Old Norse: [ˈweː]) or wēoh (Old English) is a type of shrine, sacred enclosure or other place with religious significance. The term appears in skaldic poetry and in place names in Scandinavia (with the exception of Iceland), often in connection with an Old Norse deity or a geographic feature.

== Functions ==
Andy Orchard says that a vé may have surrounded a temple or have been simply a marked, open place where worship occurred. Orchard points out that Tacitus, in his 1st century CE work Germania, says that the Germanic peoples, unlike the Romans, "did not seek to contain their deities within temple walls."

== Etymology ==
Vé derives from a Common Germanic word meaning sacred or holy, cf. Gothic weihs (holy), Old English wēoh, wīg (idol), German weihen (consecrate, sanctify), German Weihnachten (Christmas). It shares etymology with the phrase Þor vigi ("may Thor hallow" or "may Thor protect") found on the Canterbury Charm, Glavendrup stone, Sønder Kirkeby Runestone, Velanda Runestone and Virring Runestone. The name of the Norse god Vé also shares this etymology.

An alternative word for "sanctuary" is alhs (Gothic alhs, Runic Norse alh, Old High German alah, Anglo-Saxon ealh); for this etymology see Alu (runic).

== Attestations ==
=== References in Old English literature ===
The Old English poem Maxims I refers to weos in the following stanza:

Woden worhte weos, wuldor alwalda, rume roderas; þæt is rice god, sylf soðcyning, sawla nergend, se us eal forgeaf þæt we on lifgaþ, ond eft æt þam ende eallum wealdeð monna cynne. þæt is meotud sylfa.	Woden worked idols, the All-Wielder glory and a spacious sky—that is a powerful God, the Truth-King himself, the Savior of Souls, who forgave us all so that we might live onwards, and again at the very end, he controls us, all of mankind. That is the Measurer himself.

Wēoh is also attested in Beowulf as an element in the compound name Wēohstan (Old Norse: Vésteinn) and as an element in the word wígweorþunga, referring to the act of honouring idols.

=== References in Norse literature ===
References to a vé are made in Old Norse literature without emphasis. For example, the Prose Edda quotes a verse of the Skáldskaparmál of Skúli Þórsteinsson and mentions a vé:

Glens beðja veðr gyðju goðblíð í vé, síðan ljós kømr gótt, með geislum, gránserks ofan Mána.	God-blithe bedfellow of Glen steps to her divine sanctuary with brightness; then descends the good light of grey-clad moon.

=== Toponyms ===
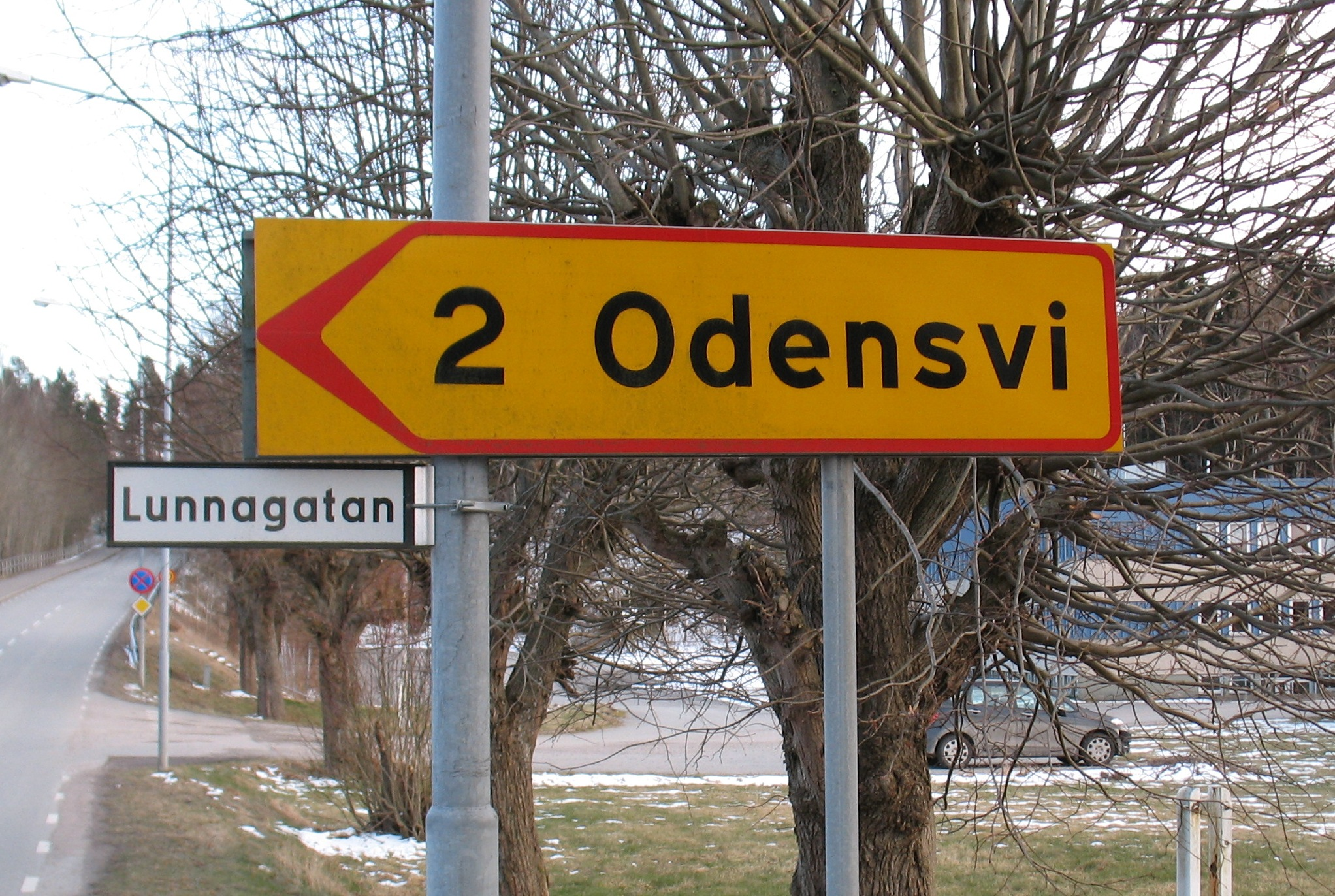
Odensvi, meaning "Odin's shrine", is one of numerous toponyms named after Odin.

Examples of -vé appearing in toponyms after the names of Norse gods and goddesses:

- Dís - Disevid in Östergötland in Sweden.
- Freyja - Härnevi in Uppland, and probably Järnevi in Östergötland, Sweden.
- Freyr - Frösvi in Östergötland, Sweden.
- Njörðr - Nalavi in Närke and two locations named Mjärdevi, in Sweden.
- Odin - Odensvi in Närke, Sweden. In Denmark, all five place names using the -vé suffix focus on Odin (examples include Odense, Denmark).
- Rindr - Vrinnevid in Östergötland, Sweden.
- Skaði - possibly Skövde in Västergötland, Skadevi in Uppland, and a number of locations named Sked(e)vi in Sweden.
- Thor - Torsvi in Uppland, Sweden.
- Ullr - numerous locations named Ull(e)vi or Ullavi in Sweden.

Eight old farms in Norway have the name Vé (in Flå, Norderhov, Ringsaker, Sande, Stamnes, Tveit, Tysnes, and Årdal). It is also common as the first element in compounded names: Vébólstaðr ("the farm with a ve"), Védalr ("the valley with a ve"), Véló ("the holy meadow"), Vésetr ("the farm with a ve"), Véstaðir ("the farm with a ve"), Vésteinn ("the holy stone"), Vévatn ("the holy lake"), Véøy ("the holy island").

The names of the Danish city of Viborg, Jutland, and the former Finnish city of Vyborg, located along the trade route from Scandinavia to Byzantium, are also considered related.

== See also ==
- Heathen hof
- Norse rituals
- Himorogi
