= Íslendingadrápa =

12th or 13th century skaldic poem

Íslendingadrápa (The drápa of the Icelanders) is a skaldic poem composed in Iceland in the 12th or 13th century. It is preserved only in AM 748 Ib 4to, one of the manuscripts of the Prose Edda. The manuscript identifies the author as one Haukr Valdísarson, a man otherwise unknown. The poem consists of 26 dróttkvætt stanzas and the first two lines of the 27th. At that point, the preserved part of the manuscript terminates and the end of the poem is lost.

The poem relates the deeds of a number of Icelandic heroes and skalds from the 10th and 11th centuries, including Egill Skallagrímsson, Grettir Ásmundarson, Kormákr Ögmundarson and Hallfreðr vandræðaskáld. Carol J. Clover has called the poem "a kind of native de viris illustribus and de casibus virorum illustrium combined".
