= List of Germanic deities =

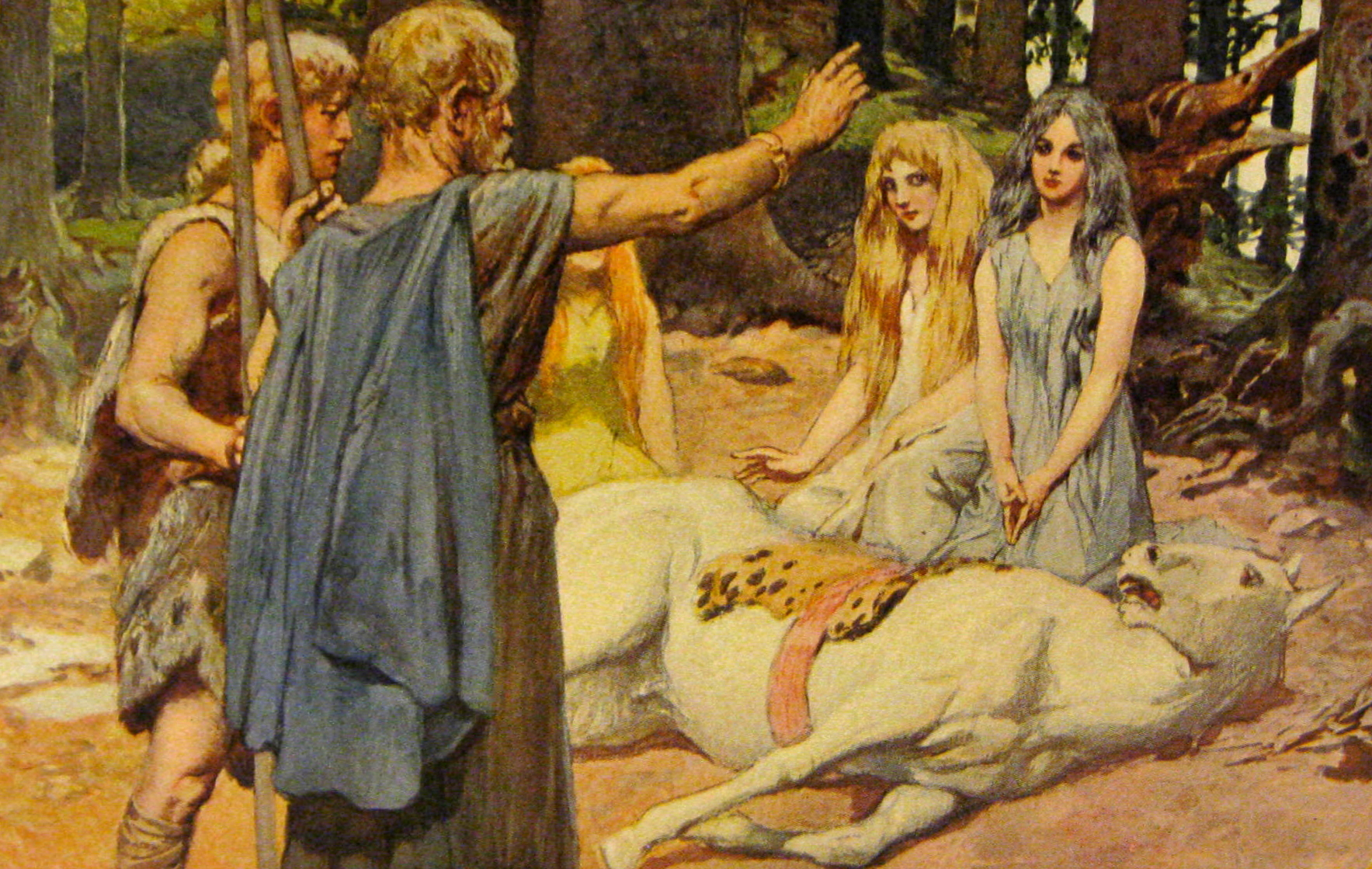
A scene from one of the Merseburg Incantations: gods Wodan and Balder stand before the goddesses Sunna, Sinthgunt, Volla, and Friia (Emil Doepler, 1905)

In Germanic paganism, the indigenous religion of the ancient Germanic peoples who inhabit Germanic Europe, there were a number of different gods and goddesses. Germanic deities are attested from numerous sources, including works of literature, various chronicles, runic inscriptions, personal names, place names, and other sources. This article contains a comprehensive list of Germanic deities outside the numerous Germanic Matres and Matronae inscriptions from the 1st to 5th century CE.

== Gods ==
Name	Name meaning	Attested consorts and sexual partners	Attested children	Attestations	Group
Alcis (Latinized Germanic)	Elk or Temple, Contested	None attested	None attested	Germania	None, but share similarities with Jötunn
Baldr (Old Norse), Bældæg (Old English), Balder (Old High German)	Old Norse form is contested. Old English form directly translates as "shining day".	Nanna	Forseti	Merseburg Incantation, Poetic Edda, Prose Edda, Gesta Danorum, Chronicon Lethrense, Annales Lundenses, possibly Beowulf	Æsir
Bragi (Old Norse)	Connected with Bragr ("poetry")	Iðunn	None attested	Poetic Edda, Prose Edda, skaldic poetry	Probably Æsir
Byggvir (Old Norse), and maybe Beowa (Old English)	"Barley"	Beyla	None attested	Poetic Edda: Lokasenna, Anglo-Saxon royal genealogies, maybe Beowulf?	Unknown
Dagr (Old Norse)	"Day"	None attested	Unnamed "sons of Dagr"	Poetic Edda, Prose Edda	Unknown
Dellingr (Old Norse)	Possibly "the dayspring" or "shining one"	Nótt	Dagr	Poetic Edda, Prose Edda, Hervarar saga ok Heiðreks	Æsir
Forseti (Old Norse)	"Chairman"	None attested	None attested	Poetic Edda, Prose Edda	Æsir
Freyr (Old Norse), Frea (Old English), Yngvi (Old Norse), Ing (Old English)	"Lord"	Freyja, Gerðr	Fjölnir	Gesta Hammaburgensis ecclesiae pontificum, Poetic Edda, Prose Edda, Heimskringla, Ögmundar þáttr dytts, Gesta Danorum, various others	Vanir
Heimdallr (Old Norse)	"World-brightener"	None attested	None attested	Prose Edda, Poetic Edda	Æsir
Hermóðr (Old Norse), Heremod (Old English)	"War-spirit"	None attested	Sceaf	Poetic Edda, Prose Edda, Beowulf, Old English royal genealogies	Æsir
Höðr (Old Norse)	"Warrior"	None attested	None attested	Poetic Edda, Prose Edda, Gesta Danorum, Chronicon Lethrense, Annales Lundenses, possibly Beowulf	Æsir
Hœnir (Old Norse)	Contested	None attested	None attested	Poetic Edda, Prose Edda, skaldic poetry	Æsir
Ítreksjóð (Old Norse)	Literally "repeated seething/boil" from the verbs "ítreka" (to repeat, to reiterate) and sjóða (to seethe, to boil).	None attested	None attested	Prose Edda: Skáldskaparmál: Nafnaþulur	Æsir
Lóðurr (Old Norse)	Contested	None attested	None attested	Poetic Edda, skaldic poetry	Unknown, but could be Vanir
Loki (Old Norse)	Contested	Sigyn, Angrboda, Svadilfari	Nari/Narfi, Váli, Jormungandr, Fenrir, Hel, Sleipnir	Poetic Edda, Prose Edda, Heimskringla, Loka Táttur, Norwegian rune poem, Danish folk tales	Æsir, Jötunn
Mannus (Latinized Germanic)	"Man", from the Proto-Germanic root *mann- – "man"	None attested	Ingaevones, Herminones, Istvaeones	Germania	Uncertain
Móði and Magni (Old Norse)	"Courage" and "Strength"	None attested	None attested	Poetic Edda, Prose Edda	Æsir
Máni (Old Norse)	"Moon" (Gives his name to Monday).	None attested	None attested	Poetic Edda, Prose Edda	Æsir
Mímir (Old Norse)	"Rememberer"	None attested	Unnamed sons	Poetic Edda, Prose Edda	Vanir
Meili (Old Norse)	"the lovely one"	None attested	None attested	Poetic Edda, Prose Edda	Æsir
Nari/Narfi (Old Norse)	Contested	None attested	None attested	Poetic Edda, Prose Edda	Uncertain
Njörðr (Old Norse)	Contested	Unnamed sister, Skaði	Freyr, Freyja, Ráðveig, Kreppvör, unnamed seven daughters	Poetic Edda, Prose Edda, Heimskringla, Egils saga, Hauksbók ring oath, place names	Vanir
Odin: Óðinn (North Germanic), Wōden (West Germanic), *Wōðanaz (Proto-Germanic) (see List of names of Odin for more)	"Frenzy" (Gives his name to Wednesday).	Frigg, Jörð, Gríðr, Rindr, Gunnlöð, Nine Mothers of Heimdallr, Hroðr, Skaði, possibly others	See Sons of Odin	Most attestations of Germanic paganism	Æsir
Óðr (Old Norse)	"The frenzied one"	Freyja	Hnoss, Gersemi	Poetic Edda: Völuspá and Hyndluljóð, Prose Edda: Gylfaginning and Skáldskaparmál, Ynglinga saga: Heimskringla	Vanir
Saxnōt (Old Saxon), Seaxnet, Seaxnēat, Saxnat (Old English)	Contested	None attested	None attested	Old Saxon Baptismal Vow, Old English royal genealogies	Unknown, but could be Æsir
Thor: Þórr (North Germanic), Þunor (Old English), Thunaer (Old Saxon), Donar (Southern Germanic areas)	"Thunder", all names stem from Proto-Germanic *ÞunraR (Gives his name to Thursday).	Sif, Járnsaxa	Móði and Magni, Þrúðr	Most attestations of Germanic paganism	Æsir
Tuisto (Latinized Germanic)	"double", from the Proto-Germanic root *twai – "two"; "a god, born of the earth" (deum terra editum)	None attested	Mannus	Germania	None, but share similarities with Jötunn
Týr (Old Norse), Tīw, Tīg (both Old English), Ziu (Old High German)	"God", derived from Proto-Germanic *Tīwaz (Gives his name to Tuesday).	Possibly Zisa	None Attested	Poetic Edda, Prose Edda, skaldic poetry, Hadrian's Wall altar	Æsir
Ullr (Old Norse)	Something like "Glory"	None attested	None attested	Poetic Edda, Prose Edda, skaldic poetry, Gesta Danorum, Thorsberg chape, toponyms in Norway and Sweden	Æsir
Váli (Old Norse)	"Chosen"	None attested	None attested	Poetic Edda, Prose Edda, Gesta Danorum (as Bous)	Æsir
Viðarr (Old Norse)	Possibly "wide ruler"	None attested	None attested	Poetic Edda, Prose Edda	Æsir
Vé (Old Norse)	Vé	Frigg	None attested	Poetic Edda, Prose Edda	Æsir
Vili (Old Norse)	"Will"	Frigg	None attested	Poetic Edda, Prose Edda	Æsir

== Goddesses ==
Name	Name meaning	Attested consorts and sexual partners	Attested children	Attestations	Group
Baduhenna (Latinized Germanic)	Badu-, may be cognate to Proto-Germanic *badwa- meaning "battle." The second portion of the name -henna may be related to -henae, which appears commonly in the names of matrons.	None attested	None attested	Tacitus's Annals	Matronae
Bil (Old Norse)	Contested	None attested	None attested	Prose Edda	Unknown, but could be Æsir
Beyla (Old Norse)	Proposed as related to "cow," "bean," or "bee."	Byggvir	None attested	Poetic Edda	Unknown, but could be Vanir
Dís (Old Norse)	"goddess"	None attested	None attested	Poetic Edda	Disir
Eir (Old Norse)	"Peace, clemency" or "help, mercy"	None attested	None attested	Poetic Edda, Prose Edda	Æsir
Ēostre (Old English)	"East" (Gives her name to Easter according to Bede).	None attested	None attested	De temporum ratione	None, but share similarities with Jötunn
Freyja (Old Norse) (See List of names of Freyja for more)	"Lady"	Freyr, Óðr	Hnoss, Gersemi	Poetic Edda, Prose Edda, Heimskringla, Sörla þáttr	Vanir
Frigg (Old Norse)	Derived from an Indo-European root meaning "Love" (Gives her name to Friday, as the Germanic equivalent of Venus).	Odin, Vili, Vé	Baldr, Höðr	Poetic Edda, Prose Edda, Gesta Danorum, Historia Langobardorum, Second Merseburg Incantation	Æsir
Fulla (Old Norse), Volla (Old High German)	Possibly "bountiful"	None attested	None attested	Second Merseburg Incantation, Poetic Edda, Prose Edda	Æsir
Gefjun (Old Norse)	Related to "giving"	Skjöldr, unnamed jötunn	Skjǫldungar, unnamed four sons	Prose Edda, Ynglinga saga, Völsa þáttr	Unknown, could be Vanir
Gersemi (Old Norse)	"Relic"	None attested	None attested	Heimskringla	Vanir
Gerðr (Old Norse)	"Fenced in"	Freyr	Fjölnir	Poetic Edda, Prose Edda, Heimskringla	Jötunn
Gná (Old Norse)	Possibly related to Old Norse Gnæfa, meaning "to project"	None attested	None attested	Prose Edda	Æsir
Gullveig (Old Norse)	Contested	None attested	None attested	Poetic Edda	Vanir
Haeva (Latinized Germanic)	Possibly "marriage"	Possibly Hercules Magusanus	None attested	Votive stone from the Netherlands (CIL XIII 8705)	None, but share similarities with Æsir
Hariasa	Possibly related to the valkyrie name Herja or meaning "goddess with lots of hair"	None attested	None attested	Stone from Cologne, Germany (CIL XIII 8185)	None, but share similarities with Æsir
Hlín (Old Norse)	Possibly related to the Old Norse term hleinir, itself possibly meaning "protects"	None attested	None attested	Poetic Edda, Prose Edda	Æsir
Hludana (Latinized Germanic)	"The famous"	None attested	None attested	Votive stones from the Netherlands and Nordrhein-Westfalen, Germany	None, but share similarities with Æsir
Hnoss (Old Norse)	"Treasure"	None attested	None attested	Prose Edda	Vanir
Hretha (Old English)	Possibly "the famous" or "the victorious"	None attested	None attested	De temporum ratione	None, but share similarities with Æsir
Idis (Old Norse)	well-respected and dignified woman	None attested	None attested	Merseburg charms	Idisi
Ilmr (Old Norse)	Potentially related to Old Norse ilmr, a masculine noun meaning "pleasant scent"	None attested	None attested	Prose Edda, skaldic poetry	Unknown, could be Æsir
Iðunn (Old Norse)	Possibly "ever young"	Bragi	None attested	Poetic Edda, Prose Edda	Æsir
Irpa (Old Norse)	Possibly relating to "dark brown"	None attested	None attested	Jómsvíkinga saga, Njáls saga	Unknown, could be Æsir
Lofn (Old Norse)	Potentially related to "Praise"	None attested	None attested	Prose Edda	Æsir
Nanna (Old Norse)	Possibly "mother" from nanna, or potentially related to nanþ-, meaning "the daring one"	Baldr	Forseti	Poetic Edda, Prose Edda, Gesta Danorum, Chronicon Lethrense, Setre Comb	Æsir
Nehalennia (Latinized Germanic)	Possibly "she who is at the sea"	None attested	None attested	Votive altars discovered around what is now the province of Zeeland, the Netherlands	None, but share similarities with Jötunn
Nerthus (Latinized Germanic, from Proto-Germanic *Nerthuz)	Latinized form of what Old Norse Njörðr would have looked like around 1 CE.	None attested	None attested	Germania	None
Njörun (Old Norse)	Possibly related to the Norse god Njörðr and the Roman goddess Nerio	None attested	None attested	Poetic Edda, Prose Edda, skaldic poetry	Æsir
Norns (Old Norse) (Urðr, Verðandi, Skuld)	Unknown	None attested	None attested	Poetic Edda, skaldic poetry	Nornir
Rán (Old Norse)	"Theft, robbery"	Ægir	Nine daughters	Poetic Edda, Prose Edda, Friðþjófs saga hins frœkna	Jötunn
Rindr (Old Norse)	Possibly related to *Vrindr	Odin	Váli	Poetic Edda, Prose Edda, Gesta Danorum	Jötunn
Sága (Old Norse)	Possibly "to see"	None attested	None attested	Poetic Edda, Prose Edda, skaldic poetry	Æsir
Sandraudiga (Latinized Germanic)	"She who dyes the sand red."	None attested	None attested	North Brabant stone	None
Sif (Old Norse)	"In-law-relationship"	Thor, unnamed jötunn	Ullr, Þrúðr	Poetic Edda, Prose Edda	Æsir
Sigyn (Old Norse)	"Victorious girl-friend"	Loki	Nari, Narfi and/or Váli	Poetic Edda, Prose Edda	Æsir
Sinthgunt (Old High German)	Contested	None attested	None attested	Second Merseburg Incantation	None
Sjöfn (Old Norse)	"Love"	None attested	None attested	Prose Edda	Unknown, could be Æsir
Skaði (Old Norse)	Possibly related to Scandia.	Njörðr, Ullr, Odin	Sæmingr, possibly Ráðveig, possibly Kreppvör, possibly unnamed seven daughters	Poetic Edda, Prose Edda, Ynglinga saga	Jötunn
Snotra (Old Norse)	"The clever one"	None attested	None attested	Prose Edda	Æsir, although very similar to Vanir
Sól (Old Norse), Sunna (Old High German)	"Sun" (Gives her name to Sunday).	Glenr	Unnamed daughter	Second Merseburg Incantation, Poetic Edda, Prose Edda	None, but shares similarities with Vanir
Syn (Old Norse)	"Refusal"	None attested	None attested	Prose Edda	Aesir, Disir, Matronae
Tamfana (Latinized Germanic)	Unknown	None attested	None attested	Germania, Tamfanae sacrum inscription	Unknown
Þrúðr (Old Norse)	"Power"	None attested	None attested	Poetic Edda, Prose Edda, Karlevi Runestone	Æsir
Þorgerðr Hölgabrúðr (Old Norse)	Literally "Þorgerðr Hölgi's Bride"	None attested	Hölgi, possibly others	Jómsvíkinga saga, Njáls saga, Skáldskaparmál, Færeyinga saga	Æsir
Vár (Old Norse)	"Beloved"	None attested	None attested	Poetic Edda, Prose Edda	Æsir
Vihansa (Latinized Germanic)	"War-goddess"	None attested	None attested	Votive stone from Belgium (CIL XIII 3592)	Unknown
Vör (Old Norse)	Possibly "the careful one"	None attested	None attested	Prose Edda, Poetic Edda Thrymsvitha	Æsir
Zisa	Possibly related to *Tiwaz	None attested	Possibly Tyr	Codex Monac, Codex Emmeran, and Suevicarum rerum scriptores	Unknown, could be Æsir

== Pseudo-deities and purported deities ==
- Astrild, a synonym for the Roman deity Amor or Cupid invented and used by Nordic Baroque and Rococo authors
- Biel, a purported deity potentially stemming from a folk etymology
- Ercol, a synonym for the Roman deity Hercules used in King Alfred's Anglo-Saxon version of Boethius de Consolatione Philosophiae
- Frau Berchta, a purported deity and female equivalent of Berchtold proposed by Jacob Grimm
- Holda, a purported deity proposed by Jacob Grimm
- Jecha, a purported deity potentially stemming from a folk etymology
- Jofur, a synonym for the Roman deity Jupiter invented and used by Nordic Baroque and Rococo authors
- Lahra, a purported deity potentially stemming from a folk etymology
- Reto, a purported deity potentially stemming from a folk etymology
- Stuffo, a purported deity potentially stemming from a folk etymology

== Related deities ==
- List of Anglo-Saxon deities
- Common Germanic deities
