= Hnoss =

Minor goddess in Norse mythology

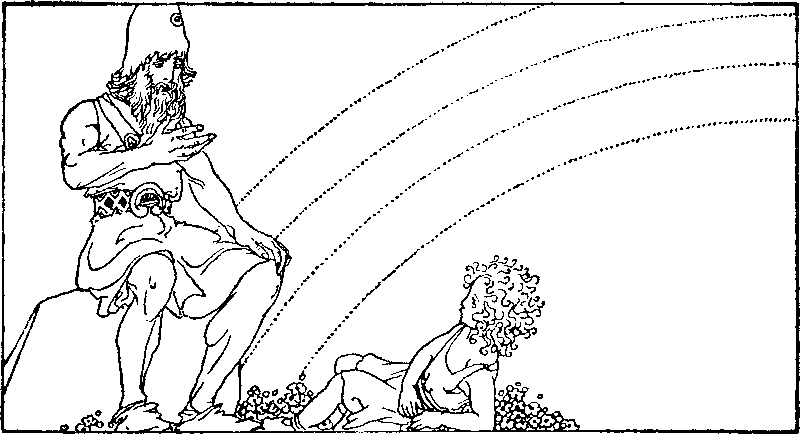
- Heimdall and the little Hnoss in How all things came to be by Willy Pogany (1920).

Genealogy
- Parents: Freyja and Óðr
- Siblings: Gersemi

In Norse mythology, Hnoss (Old Norse: "treasure", Icelandic pronunciation: [n̥ɔsː]) is the daughter of Freyja and Óðr, and the twin sister of Gersemi. She comes from the Vanir tribe and is the goddess of wealth, friendship and happiness. Hnoss is also linked with care, precious valuables, gifts —especially small ones and handmade presents— passion and respect.

== Name ==
The Old Norse term Hnoss has been translated in a variety of ways by scholars and folklorists. David Leeming and Christopher Fee in their joint book The Goddess: Myths of the Great Mother claim that Hnoss' name was drawn from the word for "gem," in which she is described as sparkling like a diamond. Given Hnoss is the daughter of the most beautiful goddess Freyja, it should come as no surprise that jewels bear her name.

Hilda Ellis Davidson in her Roles of the Northern Goddess similarly claims that Hnoss' name derives from a great beauty whose name may be "used for treasure in poetry" or simply "treasure." This translation shares semantic and etymological similarities with the Icelandic word hnoss (meaning "nipper") as well as the Old Danish words noss (meaning "sweetheart") and nusse (meaning "infant"). In the Prose Edda, Snorri Sturluson states that beautiful things were called hnossir (Old Norse: 'treasures') after her name.

Despite various interpretations, The Concept of The Goddess, states that Hnoss "bears her mother's eyelash-rain," which translates to "there is gold on the precious object."

== Role and interpretation ==
Modern scholars generally interpret Hnoss as less as an independently active deity, and more as a personification of treasure, beauty, or precious objects within Old Norse poetic tradition. Her name is linked to the Old Norse word hnoss meaning “treasure” or “jewel”, and she is often understood through this association rather than through detailed mythological narratives. She is known as a goddess of the personification of treasure and not as a "goddess of happiness".

== Attestations ==
In Gylfaginning (The Beguiling of Gylfi), Hnoss is portrayed as the beautiful daughter of Freyja and Óð:

Freyia is highest in rank next to Frigg. She was married to someone called Od. Hnoss is the name of their daughter. She is so beautiful that from her name whatever is beautiful and precious is called hnossir [treasures].

— Gylfaginning, 34–35, trans. A. Faulkes, 1987.

In Skáldskaparmál (The Language of Poetry), a þulur (18–22) mentions Hnoss as the daughter of Freyja ("How shall Freyia be referred to? By calling her (...) mother of Hnoss"), and in Ynglinga saga a passage (Chapter Ten) describes "Hnoss and Gersimi" as her daughters. Gersemi (whose name also means 'treasure' and only appears in this passage of the Prose Edda) could be the same figure as Hnoss.

The 12th-century skald Einarr Skúlason, cited by Snorri in Skáldskaparmál, refers to Hnoss in a kenning as Freyia's "glorious child" and Freyr’s niece:

I am able to possess Horn’s [Freyia’s] gold-wrapped glorious child [Hnoss; hnoss = treasure]. We received a valuable treasure. Ocean’s fire [gold] rests on shield’s damager [axe]. Freyr’s niece [Hnoss] bears her mother’s eyelash-rain [tears]

— Einarr Skúlason, Skáldskaparmál, 36–37, trans. A. Faulkes, 1987.
