= Óðr =

Norse god of vehemence, passion and longing

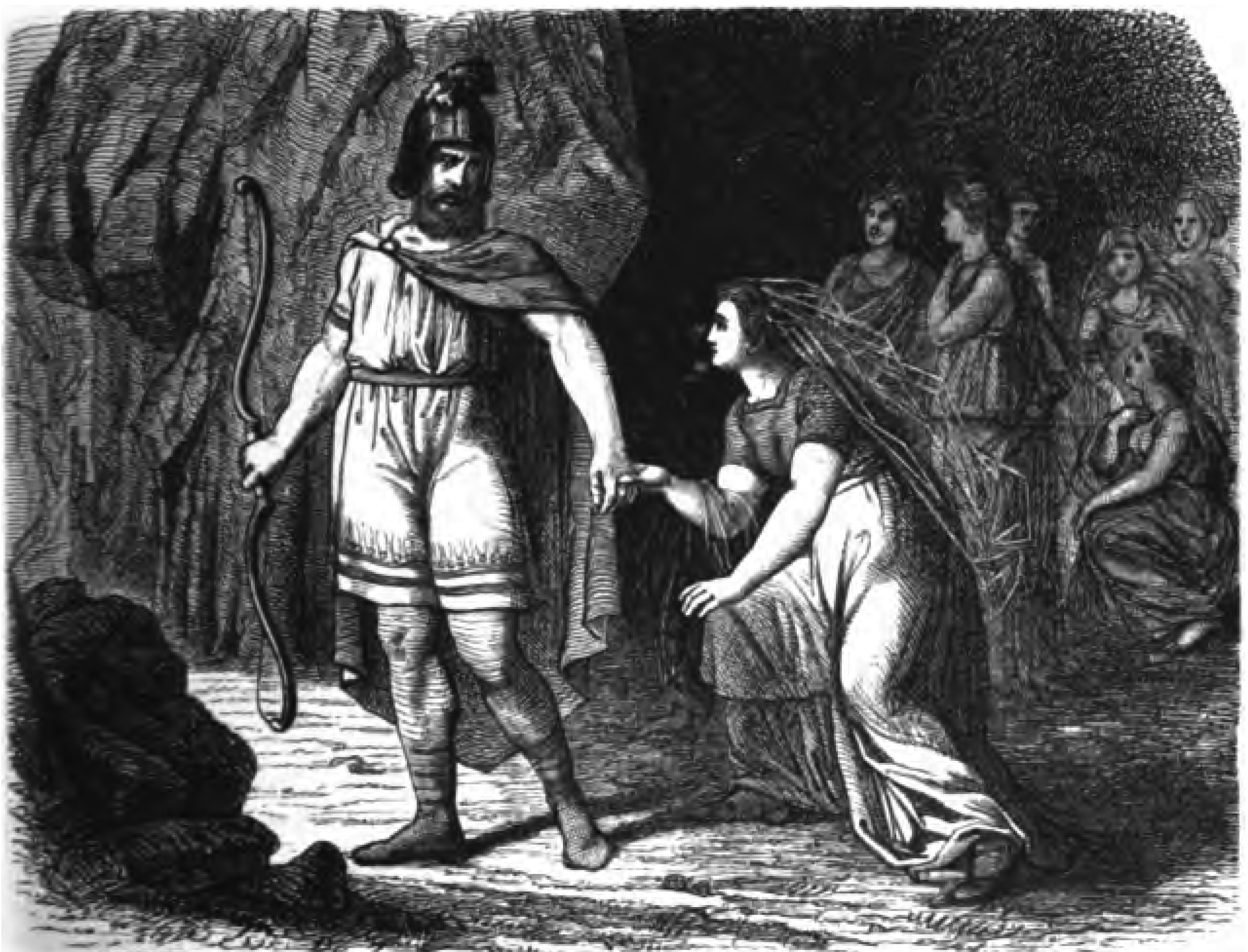
Ódr and Freyja in Óðr once again begins another journey, leaving Freyja distressed by Carl Emil Doepler 'The Elder' (1882).

In Norse mythology, Óðr (in Old Norse: 'mind', 'wit', 'soul', 'sense' or 'the frenzied one' by Orchard) or Óð, anglicized as Ódr or Ód, is a god associated with desire, passion and inspiration. The Prose Edda and Heimskringla, written in the 13th century by Snorri Sturluson, both describe Óðr as the husband of Freyja, the father of Hnoss and Gersemi, and one of the Vanir. A number of theories have been proposed about Óðr, generally that he is a hypostasis of the god Odin due to their similarities.

== Etymology ==
The Old Norse theonym Óðr derives from an identical noun, meaning 'mind, wit, soul, sense' but also 'song, poetry', which in turn stems from Proto-Germanic *wōðaz, a substantive of an adjective meaning 'possessed, inspired, delirious, raging'. It is cognate with other nouns from medieval Germanic languages, such as Old English wōð ('sound, noise; voice, song'), Old High German wuot ('thrill, violent agitation') and Middle Dutch woet ('rage, frenzy'). Óðr is also etymologically related to the Old Norse theonym Óðinn, itself deriving from the stem *wōđa- attached to the suffix *-naz ('master of').

Philologist Jan de Vries has argued that the Old Norse deities Óðinn and Óðr were probably originally connected (as in the doublet Ullr–Ullinn), with Óðr (*wōđaz) being the elder form and the ultimate source of the name Óðinn (*wōđa-naz). He further suggested that the god of rage Óðr–Óðinn stood in opposition to the god of glorious majesty Ullr–Ullinn in a similar manner to the Vedic contrast between Varuna and Mitra.

The adjective *wōđaz ultimately stems from a Pre-Germanic form *uoh₂-tós, which is related to the Proto-Celtic term *wātis, meaning 'seer, sooth-sayer' (cf. Gaulish wāteis, Old Irish fáith 'prophet') and *wātus, meaning 'prophesy, poetic inspiration' (cf. Old Irish fáth 'prophetic wisdom, maxims', Old Welsh guaut 'prophetic verse, panegyric'). According to some scholars, the Latin term vātēs ('prophet, seer') is probably a Celtic loanword from the Gaulish language, making *uoh₂-tós ~ *ueh₂-tus ('god-inspired') a shared religious term common to Germanic and Celtic rather than an inherited word of earlier Proto-Indo-European (PIE) origin. In the case a borrowing scenario is excluded, a PIE etymon *(H)ueh₂-tis ('prophet, seer') can also be posited as the common ancestor of the attested Germanic, Celtic and Latin forms.

== Attestations ==
Óðr is attested in the following sources:

=== Poetic Edda ===
Óðr is mentioned in stanza 25 of the Poetic Edda poem Völuspá. The name appears in a kenning for the major goddess Freyja; "Óð's girl" (Old Norse Óðs mey gefna), pointing to a relation with the goddess.

Stanza 47 of the poem Hyndluljóð contains mention of a figure by the name of Œdi. There, Hyndla taunts Freyja, stating that Freyja had run to Œdi, "always full of desire". Scholar Carolyne Larrington says that the identity of Œdi is uncertain; it has been theorized that this may simply be Óðr, or that the figure may be another lover of Freyja's. Scholar John Lindow describes this reference as "puzzling" as no other information is provided regarding the situation referred to by Hyndla. Scholar Britt-Mari Näsström says that this reference likely does not refer to Óðr, rather being the product of the amendments of Sophus Bugge, and that the line simply points to Freyja's lust. Näsström comments that "perhaps the philologists of the nineteenth century were misled by their romantic intentions".

=== Prose Edda ===
In chapter 35 of the Prose Edda book Gylfaginning, the enthroned figure of High says that the goddess Freyja "was married to someone named" Óðr. High details that the two produced a daughter, Hnoss, and that this daughter was so fair that the term hnossir (meaning "treasures") derives from her name and is applied to whatever is "beautiful and precious." High adds that Óðr would go off traveling for extended periods, all the while Freyja would stay behind weeping tears of red gold. However, Freyja would travel "among strange peoples" while looking for Óðr, and so had many names. In chapter 36 of Gylfaginning, the stanza of Völuspá mentioning Óðr is quoted.

In chapter 20 of the Prose Edda book Skáldskaparmál, poetic names for the goddess Freyja are listed, including "wife of Óðr". In chapter 36, a prose narrative points out than an excerpt of a work by the skald Einarr Skúlason refers to Freyja as the wife of Óðr ("Óðr's bedfellow"). The same excerpt appears in chapter 49. In chapter 75, Óðr is mentioned a final time in the Prose Edda, where Freyja is cited as having "wept gold" for Óðr.

=== Heimskringla ===
In chapter 1 of the Heimskringla book Ynglinga saga, Snorri Sturluson refers to the two in an euhemerized account, stating that Freyja had a husband named Óðr, two daughters named Hnoss and Gersemi, and that they were so beautiful that their names were used for "our most precious possessions" (both of their names literally mean "jewel").

== Theories ==
The name Óðr for Freyja's husband appears prominently in Völuspá 25, where it is said that "Óðs mey" was given to the giants. Nothing else is stated of him by this name in the Eddic poems. In Gylfaginning, Snorri briefly states that Óðr traveled to many nations and that Freyja searched for him in earnest, weeping as she went. Óðr is often theorized as somehow connected to Odin (Old Norse: Óðinn), the head of the Æsir in Norse mythology, by way of etymological similarities between the two names (Lindow states that the linguistic relationship is identical to that of Ullr and Ullin—often considered as variant names of a single god), and the fact that both are described as going on long journeys, though Lindow points out that Snorri is careful to keep them apart. All theories regarding him must remain speculative, due to the limited accounts contained in the sources.

Scholar Viktor Rydberg proposed that Freyja's husband Oðr is identical with the hero Svipdag from the eddic poems Grougaldr and Fjölsvinsmál. Jacob Grimm and others have long identified Menglad ("the neck-lace lover"), Svipdag's love interest in that poem, with Freyja the owner of Brísingamen.

Scholar Hilda Ellis Davidson proposes that a cult of the Vanir may have influenced a cult of the Æsir in the waning days of Norse paganism during the Christianization of Scandinavia, potentially resulting in the figure of Óðr in Norse mythology, which she refers to as a "strange double of Odin".

Scholar Rudolf Simek says that since Óðr appears in a kenning employed by the 11th century skald Einarr Skúlason (in Skáldskaparmál) and in the Poetic Edda poems Völuspá and Hyndluljóð, Óðr is not a late invention. Simek says that "the most obvious explanation is to identify Óðr with Odin," noting the similarity between their names (and agreeing with the Ullr/Ullin parallel), the long absences (comparing them to Odin's exile in Gesta Danorum), and Óðr's marriage with Freyja.

Simek adds that although these similarities exist, there are things that speak against it, such as that "Freyja's tears for Odin and her search are unmotivated," and that "the reference to Hnoss as their only child is surprising—why, for example, should Baldr not be mentioned?" Simek notes that these issues have resulted in sometimes very different explanations; Sophus Bugge and Hjalmar Falk saw a reflection of the Greek god Adonis in Óðr, Rudolf Much saw a reflection in the god Attis, and Lee Hollander theorizes a reflection of the folktale of Amor and Psyche in Snorri's Prose Edda account of Óðr and Freyja.

Simek concurs that, if the two gods were identical, Snorri would not have kept them so apart; yet that the names Odin and Óðr are so close that a lack of connection between the two gods isn't possible. Some scholars have examined the relationship between the two in an attempt to find "older" and "younger" layers in the figures of Óðr and Odin, but Simek says that this approach has yet to yield any results that are convincing due to the sparsity of sources that mention Óðr.

Scholar Stephan Grundy comments that while it is conceivable that Óðr may have been invented as a separate figure from Odin after Christianization, the notion is implausible because a separate, independent figure by the name of Wod survives in folklore involving the Wild Hunt in areas as far south from Scandinavia as Switzerland. Grundy notes that Óðr appears to date to at least before the Viking Age. Grundy opines that "as pointed out by Jan de Vries and others, there is little doubt" that Óðr and Odin were once the same figure. Grundy says that Óðinn is an adjectival form of Óðr, and that Óðr may be the elder form of the two.

Grundy theorizes that the goddesses Frigg and Freyja did not stem from a single goddess. If they did not, Grundy says, the question of explaining the relationship between Freyja and Óðr becomes central, which has been one of the strongest points made in favor of the descent of Frigg and Freyja from a common goddess. Grundy notes that it is rarely mentioned that the Germanic peoples sometimes practiced polygamy, and cites chapter 18 of Tacitus' 1st century AD work Germania, where Tacitus records that while monogamy has very few exceptions in Germanic society, there are those who actively seek a polygamous marriage "for the sake of high birth." Grundy contrasts this with accounts of polygynous marriages among the Merovingians and Carolingians, points out that the only Germanic law-code that expressly forbids such relationships is that of the Visigoths, and notes that while polygynous marriages are rarely attested in Scandinavian sources, Harald I of Norway was married to seven wives simultaneously. Grundy concludes that, as "gods tend to reflect the social norms of their worshippers," it very possible that Odin/Óðr originally "could have rejoiced in Frigg and Freyja simultaneously". Grundy posits that, over time polygynous marriages dwindled during the Viking Age and into the Christianization of the North Germanic territories and, as a result, such a relationship was less easily reflected in the deities of the people.

== See also ==
- Odic force, also known as Od
