= Ullr =

Norse deity

The coat of arms of Ullensaker displays Ullr as a charge.

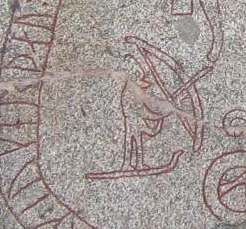
Figure on skis and with a bow, possibly Ullr, on the 11th-century Böksta Runestone

In Norse mythology, Ullr (Old Norse: [ˈulːz̠]) is an Æsir (god) associated with snow, bows, hunting, and potentially the sun. Although literary attestations of Ullr are sparse, evidence including relatively ancient place-name evidence from Scandinavia suggests that he was a major god in pre-historic Sweden. Proto-Germanic *wulþuz ('glory') appears to have been an important concept of which his name is a reflex.

== Name and origin ==
The Old Norse theonym Ullr derives from a Proto-Germanic (PGmc) form reconstructed as *Wulþuz ('Glory'). It is a cognate (linguistic sibling from the same origin) of the Gothic noun wulþus ('glory, wealth'). They ultimately derive from the Proto-Indo-European (PIE) noun *wul-tus ('sight, gaze, appearance'), itself from the root *wel- ('to see').

The PGmc term *wulþuz is an exact cognate of the Latin vultus, meaning 'facial expression, appearance'; it is further related, in Celtic languages, to the Old Irish filed ('seer, poet'), the Middle Welsh gwelet ('to see'), and the Middle Breton guelet ('sight'), all derived from a Proto-Celtic stem *wel-ēt-. The development from PIE *wul-tus to Gothic wulþus shows a semantic shift from 'sight, appearance' to 'glory, wealth', similarly evidenced in Croatian in the relationship between ugled ('respect') and gledati ('see').

The stem *wulþ- can also be found in some Germanic personal names, including Old English Wuldwine, Old High German Wuldberth, Wuldhart, Wuldrât, and Gothic Wulþuwulfs, but as a substantive meaning 'glory', rather than as the name of the god. The Old English noun wuldor ('glory') stems from a related PGmc term reconstructed as *wuldraz (itself from PIE *wul-trós). Although not used as a proper name, wuldor occurs frequently in names for the Christian God in Anglo-Saxon literature, such as wuldres cyning ('king of glory'), wuldorfæder ('glory-father'), and wuldor alwealda ('glorious all-ruler').

The related Old Norse form Ullinn was most likely originally connected to Ullr (as in the doublet Óðr–Óðinn), philologist Jan de Vries suggesting that the god of rage Óðr–Óðinn stood in opposition to the god of glorious majesty Ullr–Ullinn in a similar manner to the Vedic contrast between Varuna and Mitra.

== Attestations ==
=== Thorsberg chape ===
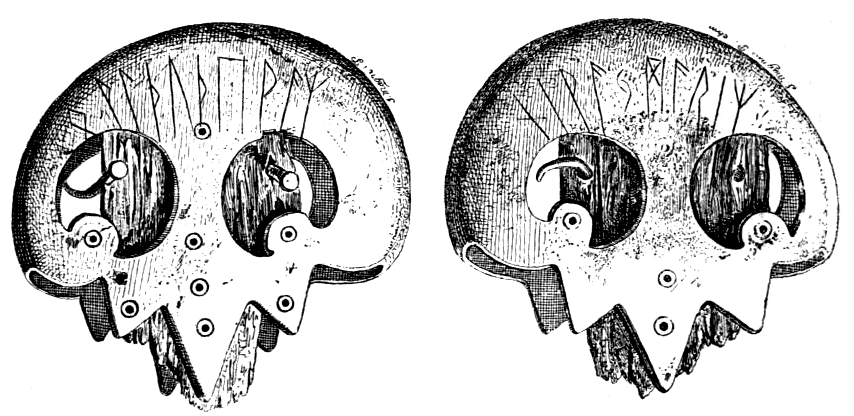
Illustration of the Thorsberg chape showing the runic inscriptions on both sides.

Ullr may be attested in the compound owlþu-þewaz (ᛟᚹᛚᚦᚢᚦᛖᚹᚨᛉ), meaning either 'servant of Owlþuz' (if interpreted as a theonym), or 'who has glorious servants' (if interpreted as an adjective), found on the Thorsberg chape (3rd c. AD).

=== Gesta Danorum ===
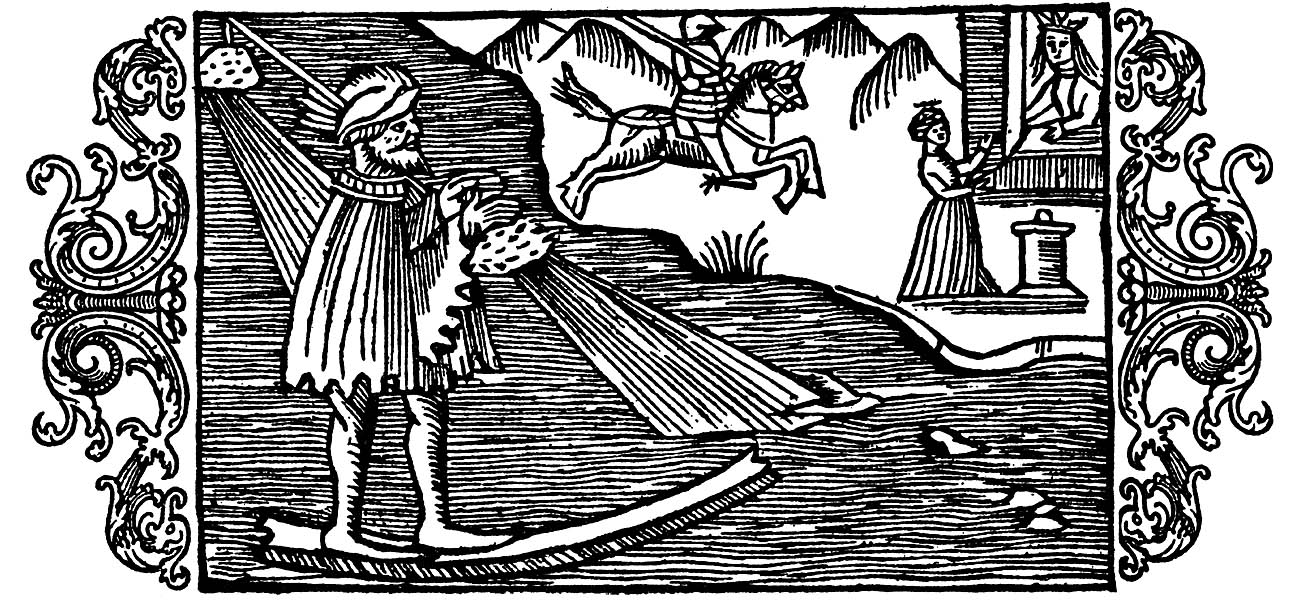
Ollerus traverses the sea on his magic bone; 16th-century woodcut

In Saxo Grammaticus' 12th-century work Gesta Danorum, where gods appear euhemerized, Ullr, latinized as Ollerus, is described as a cunning wizard with magical means of transportation:

Fama est, illum adeo praestigiarum usu calluisse, ut ad traicienda maria osse, quod diris carminibus obsignavisset, navigii loco uteretur nec eo segnius quam remigio praeiecta aquarum obstacula superaret.	The story goes that he was such a cunning wizard that he used a certain bone (probably a sledge or similar conveyance), which he had marked with awful spells, wherewith to cross the seas, instead of a vessel; and that by this bone he passed over the waters that barred his way as quickly as by rowing.– Elton's translation

When Odin was exiled, Ollerus was chosen to take his place and ruled under the name Odin for ten years until the true Odin was called back.

=== Poetic Edda ===
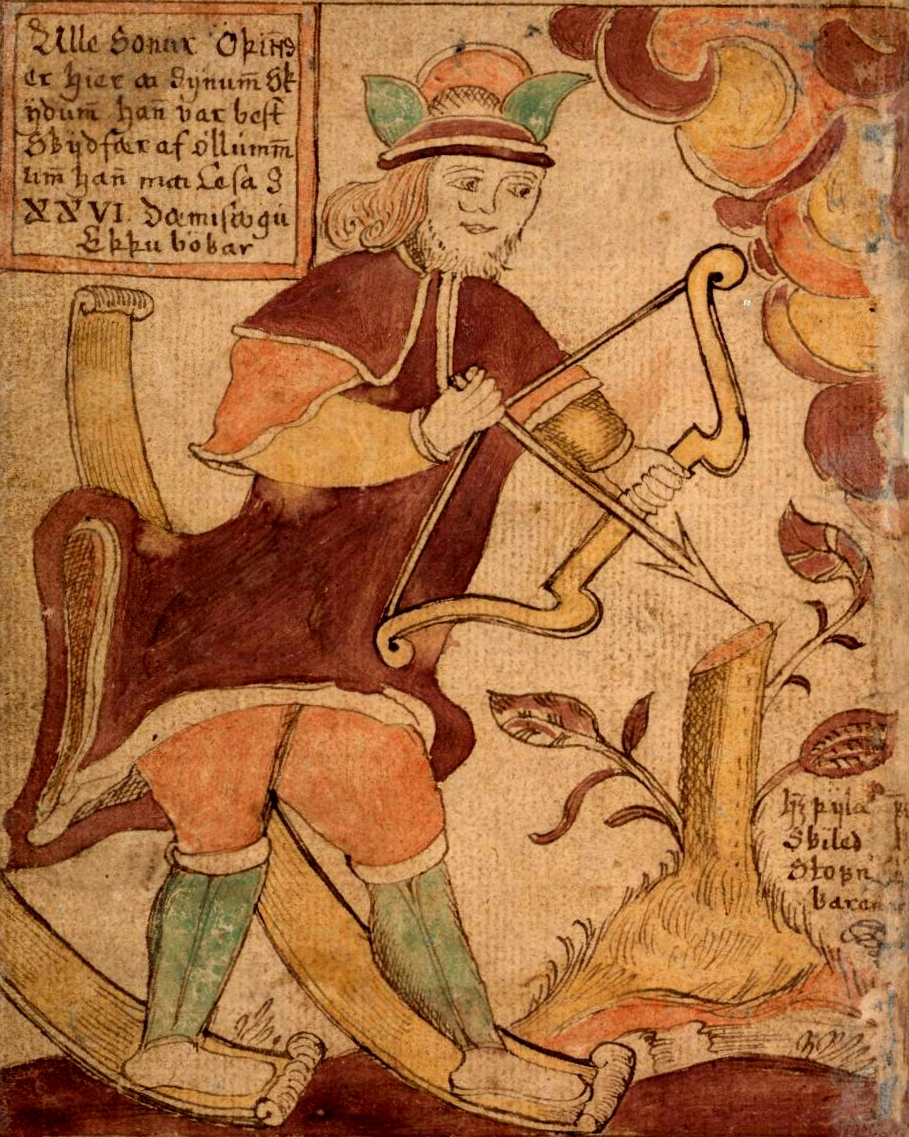
Illustration from an 18th-century Icelandic manuscript showing Ullr on his skis and with his bow

Ullr is mentioned in the poem Grímnismál where the homes of individual gods are recounted. The English versions shown here are by Thorpe.

Ýdalir heita þar er Ullr hefir sér of görva sali.	Ýdalir it is called, where Ullr has himself a dwelling made.

The name Ýdalir, meaning "yew dales", is not otherwise attested. The elastic wood of the yew was an important material in the making of bows, and the word ýr, "yew", is often used metonymically to refer to bows. It seems likely that the name Ýdalir is connected with the idea of Ullr as a bow-god.

Another strophe in Grímnismál also mentions Ullr.

Ullar hylli hefr ok allra goða hverr er tekr fyrstr á funa, því at opnir heimar verða of ása sonum, þá er hefja af hvera.	Ull’s and all the gods’ favour shall have, whoever first shall look to the fire; for open will the dwelling be, to the Æsir's sons, when the kettles are lifted off.

The strophe is obscure but may refer to some sort of religious ceremony. It seems to indicate that Ullr was an important god.

The last reference to Ullr in the Poetic Edda is found in Atlakviða:

Svá gangi þér, Atli, sem þú við Gunnar áttir eiða oft of svarða ok ár of nefnda, at sól inni suðrhöllu ok at Sigtýs bergi, hölkvi hvílbeðjar ok at hringi Ullar.	So be it with thee, Atli! as toward Gunnar thou hast held the oft-sworn oaths, formerly taken - by the southward verging sun, and by Sigtý’s hill, the secluded bed of rest, and by Ullr's ring.

Both Atlakviða and Grímnismál are often considered to be among the oldest extant Eddic poems. It may not be a coincidence that they are the only ones to refer to Ullr. Again Ullr appears to be associated with some sort of ceremony, this time the practice of swearing an oath on a ring; the ring was later associated with Thor in a reference to the Norse settlers in Dublin.

=== Prose Edda ===
In chapter 31 of Gylfaginning in the Prose Edda, written in the 13th century by Snorri Sturluson, Ullr is referred to as a son of Sif (with a father unrecorded in surviving sources) and thus a stepson of Sif's husband, Thor:

Ullr heitir einn, sonr Sifjar, stjúpsonr Þórs. Hann er bogmaðr svá góðr ok skíðfœrr svá at engi má við hann keppask. Hann er ok fagr álitum ok hefir hermanns atgervi. Á hann er ok gott at heita í einvígi.	Ullr, Sif's son and Thór's stepson, is one [too]. He is such a good archer and ski-runner that no one can rival him. He is beautiful to look at as well and he has all the characteristics of a warrior. It is also good to call on him in duels.– Young's translation

In Skáldskaparmál, the second part of the Prose Edda, Snorri mentions Ullr again in a list of kennings, informing his readers that Ullr can be called ski-god, bow-god, hunting-god and shield-god. In turn a shield can be called Ullr's ship. Despite these details, he relates no myths about Ullr, potentially as he did not know of any.

=== Skaldic poetry ===
Snorri's note that a shield can be called Ullr's ship is borne out by surviving skaldic poetry with kennings such as askr Ullar, far Ullar and kjóll Ullar all meaning Ullr's ship and referring to shields. While the origin of this kenning is unknown it could be connected with the identity of Ullr as a ski-god. Early skis, or perhaps sleds, might have been reminiscent of shields. A late Icelandic composition, Laufás-Edda, offers the prosaic explanation that Ullr's ship was called Skjöldr, "Shield".

The name of Ullr is also common in warrior kennings, where it is used as other god names are.

Ullr brands – Ullr of sword – warrior
rand-Ullr – shield-Ullr – warrior
Ullr almsíma – Ullr of bowstring – warrior

Three skaldic poems, Haustlöng, Eilífr Goðrúnarson's Þórsdrápa, and a fragment by Eysteinn Valdason, refer to Thor as Ullr's stepfather, confirming Snorri's information.

== Toponymy ==
Ullr's name appears in several important Norwegian and Swedish place names (but not in Denmark or in Iceland). This indicates that Ullr had at some point a religious importance in Scandinavia that is greater than what is immediately apparent from the scant surviving textual references. It is also probably significant that the placenames referring to this god are often found close to placenames referring to another deity: Njörðr in Sweden and Freyr in Norway. Some of the Norwegian placenames have a variant form, Ullinn. It has been suggested that this is the remnant of a pair of divine twins and that there may have existed a female goddess named Ullinn, on the model of male and female divine pairs such as Freyr and Freyja or Fjörgyn and Fjörgynn. Probably Ullr's name also can be read in the former Finnish municipality of Ullava in Central Osthrobothnia Region.

=== Norway ===
- Ullarhváll ("Ullr's hill") - name of an old farm in Oslo and of Ullevaal Stadion
- Ullestad ("Ulle's place") - name of an old farm in Voss.
- Ullarnes ("Ullr's headland") - name of an old farm in Rennesøy.
- Ullerøy ("Ullr's island") - name of four old farms in Skjeberg, Spind, Sør-Odal and Vestre Moland.
- Ullern (Ullarvin) ("Ullr's meadow") - name of old farms in Hole, Oslo, Ullensaker, Sør-Odal and Øvre Eiker.
- Ullinsakr ("Ullin's field") - name of two old farms in Hemsedal and Torpa (old church site).
- Ullinshof ("Ullin's hof") - name of three old farms in Nes in Hedmark (old church site), Nes in Akershus, and Ullensaker (old church site).
- Ullensvang ("Ullr's field") - name of an old farm in Ullensvang (old church site).
- Ullinsvin ("Ullin's meadow") - name of an old farm in Vågå (old church site).
- Ullsfjorden ("Ullr's Fjord") - fjord in Troms county. Commonly believed to be named after Ullr, although there is some uncertainty.
- Ulvik ("Ullr's bay") - municipality and fjord in Vestland county.

Magnus Olsen suggested in addition that the names of some Norwegian places including Ringsaker derive from a nickname *Ringir for Ullr based on his association with ring-oaths, but there is no evidence of this.

=== Sweden ===
- Ulleråker ("Ullr's field") Uppland
- Ultuna ("Ullr's town") Uppland
- Ullared ("Ull's clearing?") Halland
- Ullevi ("Ullr's sanctuary") Västergötland
- Lilla Ullevi, Bro, Stockholm. In 2500/70, excavations in have yielded the remains of a cult site. The site is associated with Ullr based on the toponym Lilla Ullevi ("little shrine of Ullr"). Its most notable feature is an arrangement of rocks, dated to the Vendel Period, in two "wings" with four large post holes. A total of 65 amulet rings have been recovered in the vicinity.
- Ullvi ("Ullr's sanctuary") Västmanland
- Ullene ("Ullr's meadow") Västergötland
- Ullervad ("Ullr's place to wading") Västergötland
- Ullånger ("Ullr's bay") Ångermanland
- Ullbro ("Ulls bridge") Uppland, Enköping
- Ullunda ("Ulls grove") Uppland, Enköping
- Ullstämma ("Ulls meeting") Uppland, Enköping

=== Iceland ===
Icelandic scholar Ólafur Lárusson suggested that some of the Icelandic placenames in Ullar-, usually interpreted as "wool", might also be named for Ullr, especially those such as Ullarfoss and Ullarklettur that are close to similar placenames in Goða- ("gods").

== Scholarly theories ==
The place-name evidence and the *wulþuz cognates have led many scholars to conclude that Ullr was one of the older Norse gods, whose importance had waned by the time of settlement of northern parts of Norway, well before the medieval Old Norse texts were written down. This is reflected in the lack of literary evidence for the name Ullinn. Some scholars have suggested that he was an aspect of the ancient Germanic sky-god, perhaps corresponding in northern Scandinavia to Týr in Denmark. Based on the association of Ullr and Ullinn placenames with Vanir deities, Ernst Alfred Philippson suggested that contrary to his placement in the Prose Edda among the Æsir, he was himself one of the Vanir, and the similarity between the Prose Edda description of his characteristics and those of Skaði have suggested to some that there was a link between him and Skaði's husband, Njörðr.

Viktor Rydberg speculates in his Teutonic Mythology that Ullr was the son of Sif by Egill-Örvandill, half-brother of Svipdagr-Óðr, nephew of Völundr and a cousin of Skaði, and that Ullr followed in the footsteps of Egill, the greatest archer in the mythology, and helped Svipdagr-Eiríkr rescue Freyja from the giants. Rydberg also postulates that Ullr ruled over the Vanir when they held Ásgarðr during the war between the Vanir and the Æsir, but Rudolf Simek has stated that "this has no basis in the sources whatsoever".

== Modern reception ==
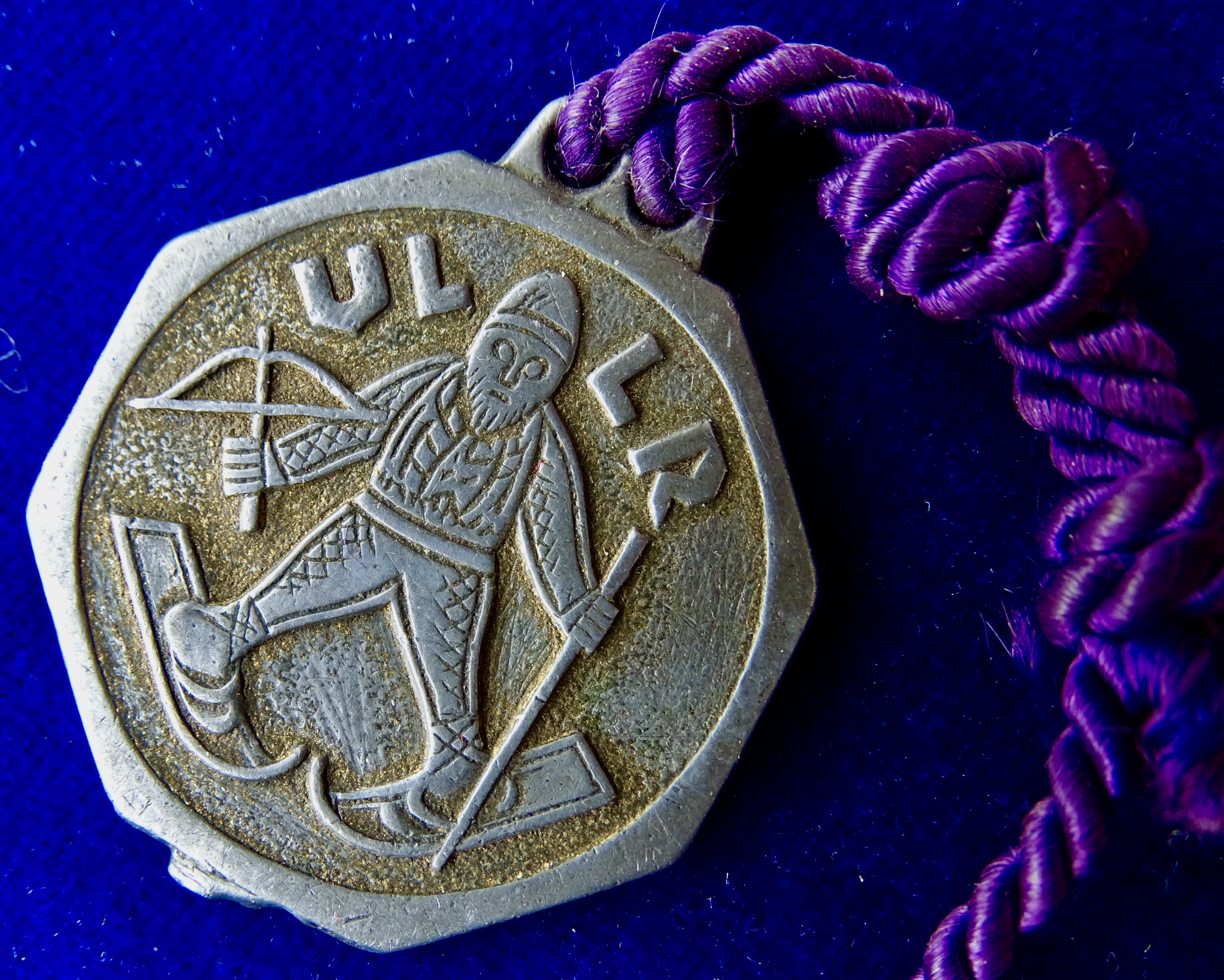
Early 20th-century Austrian lead medal depicting Ullr, Schutzpatron der Skifahrer

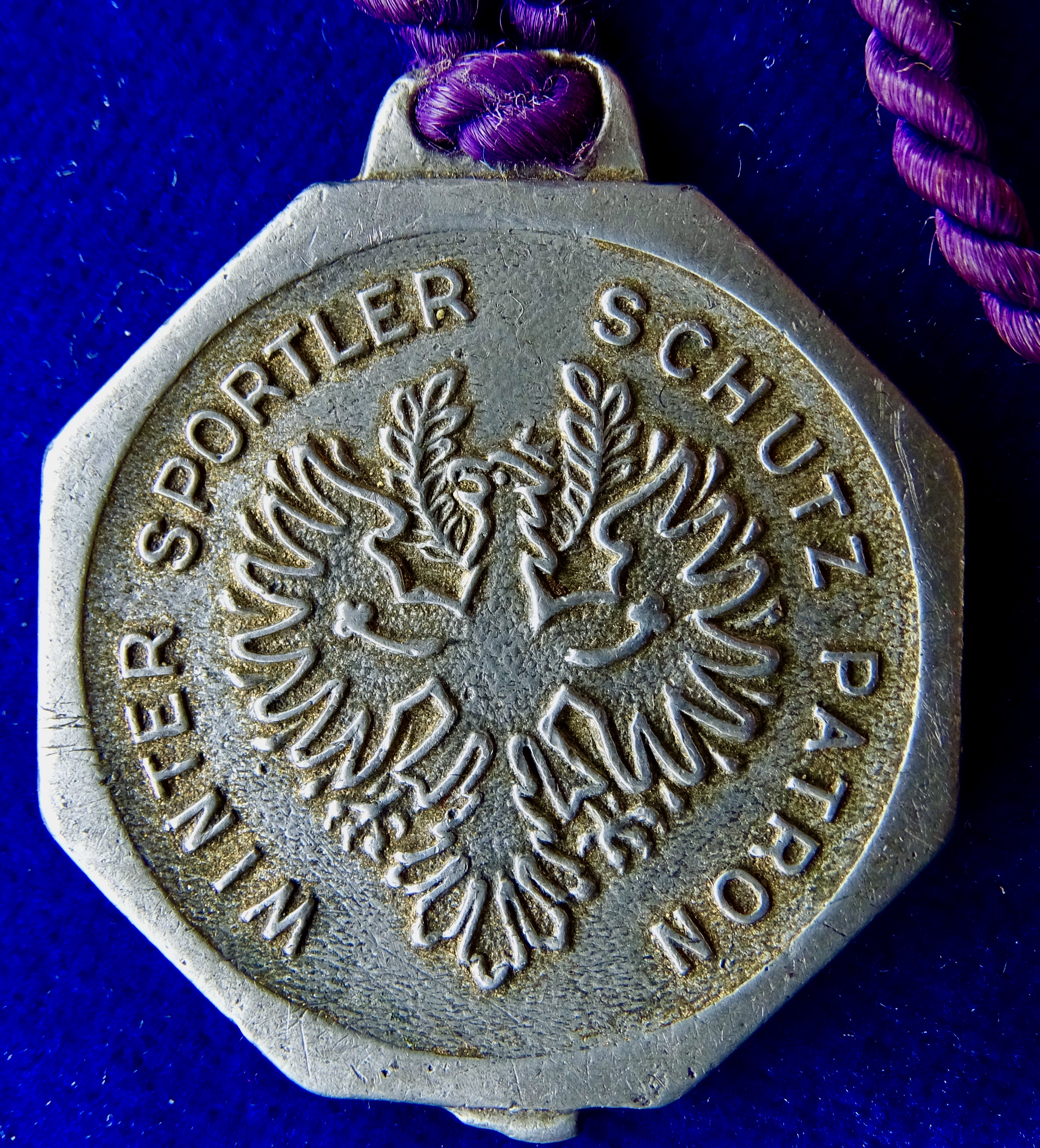
Reverse of the same medal showing the Tyrolean Eagle

Within the winter skiing community of Europe, Ullr is considered the Guardian Patron Saint of Skiers (German Schutzpatron der Skifahrer). An Ullr medallion or ski medal depicting the god on skis holding a bow and arrow, is widely worn as a talisman by both recreational and professional skiers as well as ski patrols in Europe and elsewhere.

The town of Breckenridge, Colorado has since 1963 held a week-long "Ullr Fest" each January, featuring events designed to win his favor in an effort to bring snow to the historic ski town.

Ullr is a playable character in the video game Smite.

In the television series The Almighty Johnsons, Ullr is depicted as having been reincarnated into Mike Johnson, played by Tim Balme.

In Marvel Comics, Ullr is depicted as a son of Odin and the "Lord of the Yew, God of Dark Dooms". He is rarely seen in Asgard, although his hall and his fire are sacred to storytellers.

== See also ==
- Skaði
- Coat of arms of Ullensaker
