= Thorsberg chape =

3rd-century Germanic bronze piece

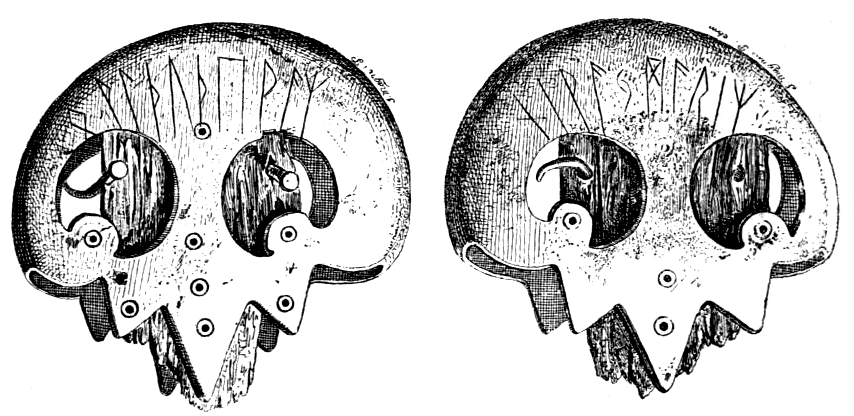
Illustration of the Thorsberg chape showing the runic inscriptions on both sides.

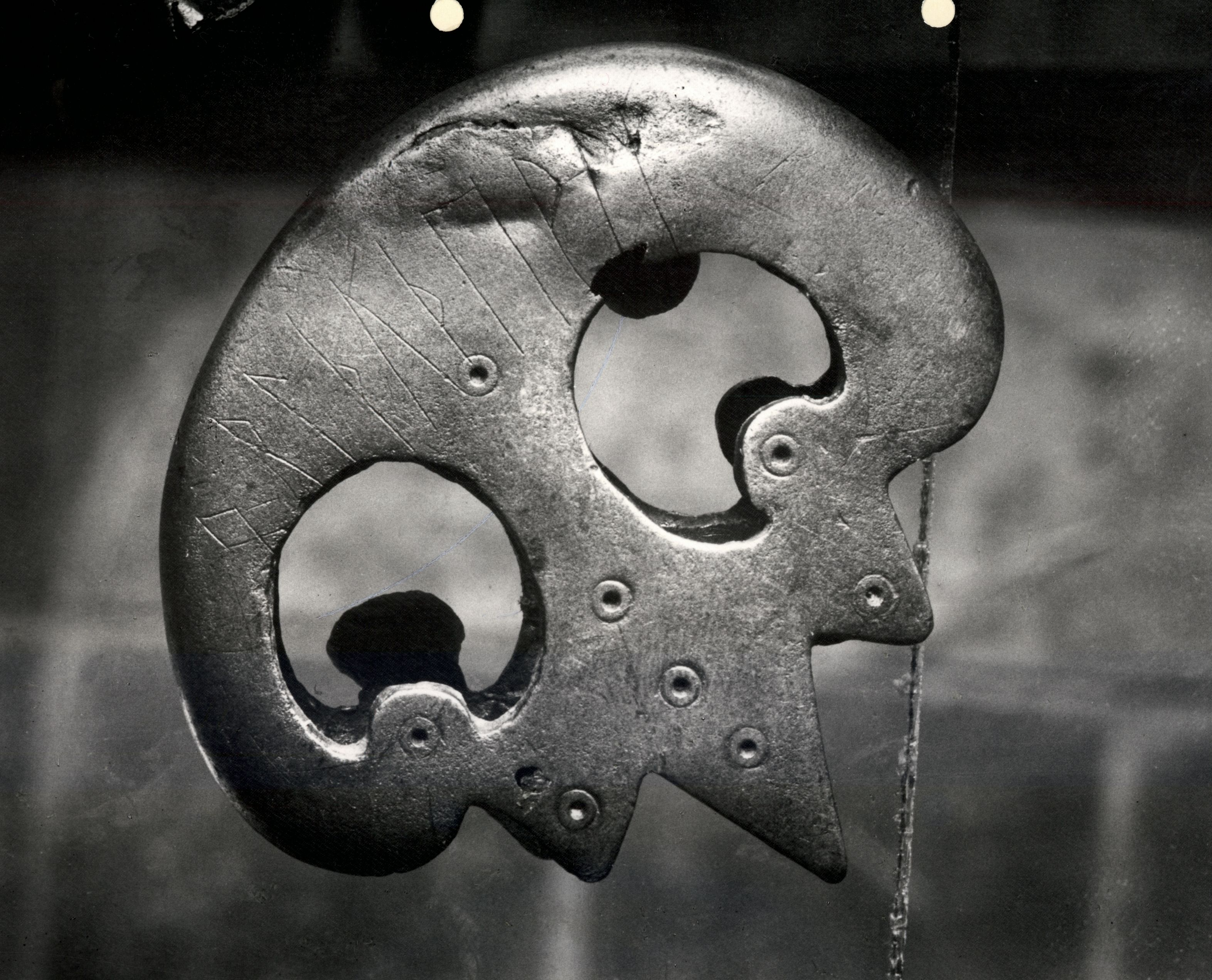
A black and white picture of the Thorsberg Chape taken at the National Museum in Copenhagen, in 1933. This side shown depicts Wulthuthewaz/Owlthuthewaz

The Thorsberg chape (a bronze piece belonging to a scabbard) was found between 1858-1861 during excavations by Danish archaeologist Helvig Conrad Engelhardt in Thorsberg moor, Germany, and appears to have been deposited as a votive offering. It bears an Elder Futhark runic inscription, one of the earliest known, dating to roughly 200 CE (~210/220 - 250/260 CE).

Archaeologists believe it was made in the region between the Rhine and the Elbe.

ᛟᚹᛚᚦᚢᚦᛖᚹᚨᛉ / ᚾᛁᚹᚨᛃᛖᛗᚨᚱᛁᛉ
owlþuþewaz / niwaj͡emariz
"Wolthuthewaz is well-renowned," or "the servant of Ullr, the renowned."

The first element is owlþu, for Proto-Germanic "wulþuz", meaning "splendour" or "glory," cf. Gothic "wulþus", Old Norse "Ullr", Old English "wuldor". The second element, "-þewaz", means "slave, servant." The whole compound could have many potential readings, but most scholars agree that it is a proper name. There has been some debate on how to further interpret the meaning of the name, namely whether or not it is sacral. Were it to be, the meaning would read, "servant of the glorious one" or "servant/priest of Ullr." If the first part refers to the god Ullr, it is the only reference to that god from south of Denmark, and also, if a personal name, the only Continental Germanic example of a person named after a specific Germanic god.. It is also notable that were this name to be sacral, we would expect the first element to be in the genitive case, which it is not. This all points to the likelihood the name refers simply to an aspect of the sword or owner rather than being a theonym. On the reverse, ni- is the negative particle, waje- corresponds to "woe, ill" (Old Norse vei), and the final element is -mariz "famous" (Old English mǣre) - the "e" and "m" are written together, as a bind-rune, an unusual early example but probably not linguistically significant. The second word thus translates to "not ill-famous," i.e., "famous, renowned" or "not of ill fame, not dishonored." Similar double negatives are found on other runic inscriptions. The translation of the inscription can thus be either "Wolthuthewaz is well-renowned," or "the glorious-servant is well-renowned".

Another reading, avoiding the emendation of the first element, reads the first letter ideographically, "Othala," resulting in o[þalan] w[u]lþuþewaz / niwajmariz "inherited property of Wulthuthewaz, the renowned." However, the owner's name is not in the possessive case as would be expected with such a usage; moreover, the rune Fehu, signifying simply "property," would be more apposite; "Othala" can specifically denote real estate.

It is possible that the inscription is poetic; it can be read as an alliterative long-line.

== See also ==
- Weapons sacrifice
