= Gersemi =

Norse mythical character

In Norse mythology, Gersemi (Old Norse: "treasure") is the daughter of Freyja and Óðr, and the twin sister of Hnoss. She comes from the Vanir tribe and is the goddess of beauty, adoration and freedom. Gersemi is also linked with care, precious valuables, gifts —especially small ones and handmade presents— passion and respect.

== Name ==
The Old Norse name Gersemi means 'treasure', something which is considered precious or valuable. It is most likely a derivative of the unattested Old Norse noun *gersamr, compared with the Icelandic gersemi or the Old Swedish gärsimi ('treasure'), and with the Danish gjørsum (a special fine imposed on a manslaughterer).
