= Einarr Skúlason =

Icelandic skald (poet)

Einarr Skúlason (Note: Old Norse pronunciation: [ˈɛinˌɑrː ˈskuːlɑˌson]; Modern Icelandic: Einar Skúlason [ˈeiːnˌaːr ˈskuːlaˌsɔːn]; Modern Norwegian: Nynorsk: Einar Skulason; Bokmål: Einar Skuleson) (c. 1100 – after 1159) was an Icelandic priest and skald. He was the most prominent Norse poet of the 12th century. Einarr's poetry is primarily preserved in Heimskringla, Flateyjarbók, Morkinskinna, Fagrskinna and Skáldskaparmál.

He was descended from the family of Egill Skallagrímsson, the so-called Mýramenn. For most of his life he lived in Norway, during the reign of kings Sigurd Magnusson, Harald Gille and the sons of the latter, especially Eysteinn Haraldsson, whose marshall he became. After Eysteinn's death in 1157, he composed the poem Elfarvísur for the nobleman Gregorius Dagsson (died 1161), referring to his victory over King Hákon Herdebrei at Göta älv in Götaland.

The best known of Einarr's drápur is Geisli ("Ray of Light"), about St. Olaf Haraldsson. This drápa was recited in the Church of Christ in Nidaros in the presence of the three Norwegian kings of the time, Eysteinn, Sigurd and Inge, along with Jon Birgersson, Archbishop of Nidaros. The poem is composed in the dróttkvætt metre and it is the earliest completely preserved drápa with Christian content.
