= List of jötnar in Norse mythology =

The extant sources for Norse mythology, particularly the Prose and Poetic Eddas, contain many names of jötnar and gýgjar (often glossed as giants and giantesses respectively). While many of them are featured in extant myths of their own, many others have come down to us today only as names in various lists provided for the benefit of skalds or poets of the medieval period and are included here for the purpose of completeness.

== List of jötnar ==
=== A ===
Name	Name meaning	Alternative names	Attested relatives	Attestations
Ægir	Sea	Hlér, Gymir	Father: Fornjótr; Brothers: Logi, Kári; Wife: Rán; Daughters: Blóðughadda, Bylgja, Dröfn, Dúfa, Hefring, Himinglæva, Hrönn, Kólga, Uðr	Hversu Noregr byggðist, Lokasenna, Nafnaþulur, Skáldskaparmál
Alfarinn				Nafnaþulur
Alsvartr	all black			Nafnaþulur
Alvaldi	"The all-powerful one"	None attested	Wife: Greip; Sons: Gangr, Iði, Þjazi	Skáldskaparmál
Áma	Big barrel, harass			Nafnaþulur
Ámr	Dark, auburn			Nafnaþulur
Ámgerðr				Nafnaþulur
Andaðr	Breathed	None attested	None attested	Hervarar saga ok Heiðreks
Andudr				
Angeyja	Contested	Augeia	Father: Geirröðr; Sisters: Atla, Eistla, Eyrgjafa, Gjálp, Greip, Imðr, Járnsaxa, Ulfrún; Partner: Odin; Son: Heimdallr	Gylfaginning, Heimdalargaldr, Skáldskaparmál, Völuspá hin skamma
Angrboda	"The one who brings grief" or "she-who-offers-sorrow"	Járnviðja (possibly)	Partner: Loki; Children: Fenrir, Jörmungandr, Hel	Gylfaginning, Völuspá hin skamma
Angurþjasi				Vilhjalms saga sjóðs
Arinefja				Vilhjalms saga sjóðs
Asvid		None attested	None attested	Hávamál
Atla	"The argumentative one"	None attested	Father: Geirröðr; Sisters: Angeyja, Eistla, Eyrgjafa, Gjálp, Greip, Imðr, Járnsaxa, Ulfrún; Partner: Odin; Son: Heimdallr	Gylfaginning, Heimdalargaldr, Nafnaþulur, Skáldskaparmál, Völuspá hin skamma
Audnir				Vilhjalms saga sjóðs
Aurboða	"Gravel-bidder" or "gravel-offerer"	None attested	Husband: Gymir; Children: Beli, Gerðr	Gylfaginning, Hyndluljóð, Svipdagsmál
Aurekr				
Aurgrímnir		Örgrimnir		Nafnaþulur
Aurvandil	"Luminous wanderer"	None attested	Wife: Gróa	Chronicon Lethrense, Christ I, Gesta Danorum, Gothica Bononiensia. Orendel, Skáldskaparmál

=== B ===
Name	Name meaning	Alternative names	Attested relatives	Attestations
Bakrauf	back hole			Nafnaþulur
Baraxli				Vilhjalms saga sjóðs
Baugi	ring		Father: Gilling; Brother: Suttungr	Nafnaþulur, Skáldskaparmál
Beinskafi				Vilhjalms saga sjóðs
Beinviðr	bone wood			Nafnaþulur
Belgeygla				Vilhjalms saga sjóðs
Beli	Roarer	None attested	Parents: Gymir, Aurboða; Sister: Gerðr	Gylfaginning, Háleygjatal, Haustlöng, Skírnismál, Völuspá
Bergelmir	"Mountain Yeller" or "Bear Yeller"	None attested	Father: Þrúðgelmir	Gylfaginning, Nafnaþulur, Vafthrudnismal
Bestla	Contested	None attested	Father: Bölþorn; Brother: Mímir; Husband: Borr; Sons: Odin, Vili, Vé	Hávamál, Gylfaginning
Billingr	twin, hermaphrodite			Hávamál
Bjalki				Vilhjalms saga sjóðs
Björgólfr	shelter wolf			Nafnaþulur, Sturlu þáttr
Blætanna				Vilhjalms saga sjóðs
Blapþvari				Nafnaþulur
Blóðughadda	"Bloodstained-hair"	Blóthughadda	Parents: Ægir, Rán; Sisters: Bylgja, Dröfn, Dúfa, Hefring, Himinglæva, Hrönn, Kólga, Uðr	Helgakviða Hundingsbana I, Skáldskaparmál
Bölþorn	"Evil-thorn"	None attested	Children: Bestla, Mímir	Hávamál, Gylfaginning
Brandingi				Nafnaþulur
Brusi				Vilhjalms saga sjóðs
Brýja				Nafnaþulur
Brydja				Vilhjalms saga sjóðs
Buppa				Vilhjalms saga sjóðs
Búseyra	"Farm-starver"			Skáldskaparmál
Býleistr	Storm lightning		Parents: Fárbauti, Laufey; Brothers: Helblindi, Loki	Gylfaginning, Hyndluljóð, Skáldskaparmál, Völuspá
Bylgja	"Pressure"	None attested	Parents: Ægir, Rán; Sisters: Blóðughadda, Dröfn, Dúfa, Hefring, Himinglæva, Hrönn, Kólga, Uðr	Helgakviða Hundingsbana I, Skáldskaparmál

=== D ===
Name	Name meaning	Alternative names	Attested relatives	Attestations
Dettiklessa				Vilhjalms saga sjóðs
Dofri			Daughter: Flaumgerðr; Foster son: Bárðr	Bárðar saga Snæfellsáss, Hálfdanar þáttr svarta ok Haralds hárfagra, Nafnaþulur
Drauttur				Vilhjalms saga sjóðs
Dröfn	"Turbulent" or "breaking"	Bára	Parents: Ægir, Rán; Sisters: Blóðughadda, Bylgja, Dúfa, Hefring, Himinglæva, Hrönn, Kólga, Uðr	Helgakviða Hundingsbana I, Skáldskaparmál
Drumba				Vilhjalms saga sjóðs
Dúfa	"Addressed"	None attested	Parents: Ægir, Rán; Sisters: Blóðughadda, Bylgja, Dröfn, Hefring, Himinglæva, Hrönn, Kólga, Uðr	Helgakviða Hundingsbana I, Skáldskaparmál
Dumbr	mute, dumb, murky		Wife: Mjǫll; Son: Bárðr	Bárðar saga Snæfellsáss, Nafnaþulur, Vilhjalms saga sjóðs
Dúrnir	"Door" or "Door-warden"	None attested	None attested	Nafnaþulur

=== E ===
Name	Name meaning	Alternative names	Attested relatives	Attestations
Eggthér	blade servant, eagle	None attested	None attested	Völuspá
Elldridr				Vilhjalms saga sjóðs
Eimgeitir	fire goat, smoke goat	None attested	None attested	Nafnaþulur
Eistla	'the stormy one', 'the glowing one'	Egia	Father: Geirröðr; Sisters: Angeyja, Atla, Eyrgjafa, Gjálp, Greip, Imðr, Járnsaxa, Ulfrún; Partner: Odin; Son: Heimdallr	Gylfaginning, Heimdalargaldr, Skáldskaparmál, Völuspá hin skamma
Eisurfála	fire troll, ember troll	None attested	None attested	Nafnaþulur
Eldr	fire, old			Nafnaþulur
Eyrgjafa		Aurgiafa	Father: Geirröðr; Sisters: Angeyja, Atla, Eistla, Gjálp, Greip, Imðr, Járnsaxa, Ulfrún; Partner: Odin; Son: Heimdallr	Gylfaginning, Heimdalargaldr, Skáldskaparmál, Völuspá hin skamma

=== F ===
Name	Name meaning	Alternative names	Attested relatives	Attestations
Fála	troll woman			Nafnaþulur
Fárbauti	"Cruel Striker"	None attested	Wife: Laufey; Sons: Býleistr, Helblindi, Loki	Gylfaginning, Skáldskaparmál
Fenja	fenn dweller, arrow	None attested	Sister: Menja	Grottasöngr, Vilhjalms saga sjóðs
Fenrir		Hróðvitnir, Vánagandr	Parents: Loki, Angrboda; Siblings: Jörmungandr, Hel; Half-siblings: Narfi, Váli, Sleipnir; Children: Hati, Sköll	Nafnaþulur
Fiskreki				Vilhjalms saga sjóðs
Fjalarr	Hider			Hárbarðsljóð, Hávamál, Nafnaþulur
Fjölverkr	one who does much work, board worker			Nafnaþulur
Fjölvör				Nafnaþulur
Flangi				Vilhjalms saga sjóðs
Flaska				Vilhjalms saga sjóðs
Flæskjappa				Vilhjalms saga sjóðs
Flauma				Vilhjalms saga sjóðs
Flegda				Vilhjalms saga sjóðs
Fleggr	Thrower, flayer			Nafnaþulur
Flimbra				Vilhjalms saga sjóðs
Flotsocka				Vilhjalms saga sjóðs
Forað	demise, danger			Nafnaþulur
Fornjótr	"Ancient giant" or "Original owner"	None attested	Sons: Ægir, Logi, Kári	Hversu Noregr byggðist, Nafnaþulur, Orkneyinga saga, Skáldskaparmál, Ynglingatal
Frosti	frost		Father: Kari; Son: Snær	
Frusk				Vilhjalms saga sjóðs
Fyrnir	the old one			Nafnaþulur

=== G ===
Name	Name meaning	Alternative names	Attested relatives	Attestations
Galarr	singer, sorcerer			Nafnaþulur
Galavi				
Ganglati	"lazy walker"	None attested	None attested	Gylfaginning, Nafnaþulur
Ganglöt	"lazy walker"	None attested	None attested	Gylfaginning
Gangr	"Gait"	Aurnir	Parents: Alvaldi, Greip; Brothers: Iði, Þjazi	Nafnaþulur, Skáldskaparmál
Geirröðr	spear redder		Daughters: Angeyja, Atla, Eistla, Eyrgjafa, Gjálp, Greip, Imðr, Járnsaxa, Ulfrún	Gesta Danorum, Nafnaþulur, Skáldskaparmál, Þórsdrápa
Geitir	goat			Nafnaþulur, Vilhjalms saga sjóðs
Geitla	goat			Nafnaþulur
Gerðr	"fenced-in"	None attested	Parents: Gymir, Aurboða; Brother: Beli; Husband: Freyr; Son: Fjölnir	Gylfaginning, Heimskringla, Hyndluljóð, Lokasenna, Skáldskaparmál, Skírnismál, Vilhjalms saga sjóðs
Gestilja				Nafnaþulur
Geysa	stormer, ousher, inciter			Nafnaþulur
Gilling		Grimling	Sons: Baugi, Suttungr	Nafnaþulur, Skáldskaparmál
Gjálp	"seeress" or "roaring one"		Father: Geirröðr; Sisters: Angeyja, Atla, Eistla, Eyrgjafa, Greip, Imðr, Járnsaxa, Ulfrún; Partner: Odin; Son: Heimdallr	Nafnaþulur, Skáldskaparmál, Vilhjalms saga sjóðs
Glámr	moon, pale gleam			Grettis saga, Nafnaþulur
Glæmur				Vilhjalms saga sjóðs
Glaumr	noise, uproar			Þórsdrápa
Glaumarr	noise, uproar			Nafnaþulur
Glossa				Vilhjalms saga sjóðs
Glumra	noise			Nafnaþulur
Glyrna				Hjálmþés saga ok Ölvis
Gneip	protruding rock			Nafnaþulur
Gnepja	sea, overhanging			Nafnaþulur
Gnissa	sea, grind			Nafnaþulur
Gortanni				Vilhjalms saga sjóðs
Grani				Vilhjalms saga sjóðs
Greip	"Grasp"		Father: Geirröðr; Sisters: Angeyja, Atla, Eistla, Eyrgjafa, Gjálp, Imðr, Járnsaxa, Ulfrún; Partners: Odin, Alvaldi; Sons: Heimdallr, Þjazi, Iði, Gangr	Haustlöng, Hjálmþés saga ok Ölvis, Skáldskaparmál
Greppa				Vilhjalms saga sjóðs
Gríðr			Partner: Odin; Son: Víðarr	Gesta Danorum, Illuga saga Gríðarfóstra, Nafnaþulur, Skáldskaparmál, Þórsdrápa, Vilhjalms saga sjóðs
Gríma	mask, night			Nafnaþulur
Grímnir	mask, night			Nafnaþulur, Vilhjalms saga sjóðs
Grimólfr	masked wolf		Sons: Grímarr, Grímnir	
Gripandi				Vilhjalms saga sjóðs
Gripnir	grip			Nafnaþulur
Grottintanna	milling teeth			Nafnaþulur
Grubbi				Vilhjalms saga sjóðs
Grýla	witch, monster, fox			Nafnaþulur
Gullkjapta				Vilhjalms saga sjóðs
Guma				Nafnaþulur
Gunnlöð	"Battle-invitation"		Father: Suttungr; Partner: Odin; Son: Bragi	Hávamál, Skáldskaparmál
Gusir	cold wind, smoke			Nafnaþulur
Gyllir	golden, yelling	None attested	None attested	Nafnaþulur
Gymir	sea, devourer,	Ægir (contested)	Wife: Aurboða; Children: Beli, Gerðr	Gylfaginning, Hyndluljóð, Lokasenna, Nafnaþulur, Skáldskaparmál, Skírnismál

=== H ===
Name	Name meaning	Alternative names	Attested relatives	Attestations
Hæra				Nafnaþulur
Hafli	have, grasp			Gesta Danorum, Nafnaþulur
Haki				Vilhjalms saga sjóðs
Hála	smooth, slippery, conceal, large, tall			Nafnaþulur
Haltangi				Vilhjalms saga sjóðs
Harðgreipr	"Hard-grip"		Father: Vagnhöfði; Partner: Hadding	Gesta Danorum, Nafnaþulur
Harðverkr	"Hard worker"	Hraðverkr		Nafnaþulur, Sturlu þáttr
Hástigi	high climber			Nafnaþulur, Hjálmþés saga ok Ölvis
Hati	"He Who Hates" or "Enemy"	Mánagarmr	Father: Fenrir; Brother: Sköll	
Hausver				Vilhjalms saga sjóðs
Hefring	"Lifting"	Hevring	Parents: Ægir, Rán; Sisters: Blóðughadda, Bylgja, Dröfn, Dúfa, Himinglæva, Hrönn, Kólga, Uðr	Helgakviða Hundingsbana I, Skáldskaparmál
Heidrek			Parents: Höfund, Hervor; Wife: Sifka; Sons: Angantyr, Hlöð	Hervarar saga, Widsith
Hel			Parents: Loki, Angrboda; Siblings: Jörmungandr, Fenrir; Half-siblings: Narfi, Váli, Sleipnir	
Helblindi	"Hel-blinder" or "All-blind"		Parents: Fárbauti, Laufey; Brothers: Býleistr, Loki	Gylfaginning
Heiðr		Gullveig	Parents: Hrimnir, Hyrja; Siblings: Feima, Hljóð, Hrossþjófr, Kleima	
Helreginn	"Ruler over Hel"	None attested	None attested	Nafnaþulur
Hengikefta	"Hanging jaw"	Hengjankjapta		Nafnaþulur, Skáldskaparmál
Hergunnr				Hjálmþés saga ok Ölvis
Herkir	fire, desolator			Nafnaþulur
Herkja	noise			Nafnaþulur
Himinglæva	"Transparent"	Himinglava	Parents: Ægir, Rán; Sisters: Blóðughadda, Bylgja, Dröfn, Dúfa, Hefring, Hrönn, Kólga, Uðr	Helgakviða Hundingsbana I, Skáldskaparmál
Hljóð	silence, hearing, yell	None attested	Parents: Hrímnir, Hyrja; Siblings: Feima, Heiðr, Hrossþjófr, Kleima; Husband: Völsung; Children: Sigmund, Signy	Völsunga saga
Hlói				Nafnaþulur
Hlóra			Husband: Vingnir; Foster son: Thor	Skáldskaparmál
Hnikar				Vilhjalms saga sjóðs
Hnydja				Vilhjalms saga sjóðs
Hölgabrúðr	Hölgi's wife			Nafnaþulur
Holuskroppa				Vilhjalms saga sjóðs
Hörn				Nafnaþulur
Hracktanni				Vilhjalms saga sjóðs
Hræsvelgr	"Corpse Swallower"	None attested	None attested	Gylfaginning, Nafnaþulur, Vafþrúðnismál
Hrauðnir	destroyer, fur coat			Nafnaþulur, Vilhjalms saga sjóðs
Hrauðungr	boat shack	None attested		Nafnaþulur, Skáldskaparmál
Hremsa				Hjálmþés saga ok Ölvis
Hrímgerðr	"Frost-Gerðr", Soot-Gerðr	None attested	None attested	Helgakviða Hjörvarðssonar, Nafnaþulur
Hrímgrímnir	"Frost-masked", sooty mask	None attested	None attested	Nafnaþulur Skírnismál
Hrímnir	"the one covered with hoarfrost" or "the sooty one"		Wife: Hyrja; Children: Feima, Heiðr, Hljóð, Hrossþjófr, Kleima	Gríms saga loðinkinna, Hyndluljóð, Nafnaþulur, Skírnismál, Völsunga saga
Hrímþurs	frost giant, soot giant			Nafnaþulur
Hringvölnir	ring rounder, ring paler			Nafnaþulur
Hripstoðr				Nafnaþulur
Hróarr	famous spear			Nafnaþulur
Hroðr	"Famed"	None attested	Husband: Hymir; Son: Tyr	Hymiskviða
Hroðingr	unrest, storm, slime, fame			
Hrökkvir				Nafnaþulur
Hrönn	"Fleed"	None attested	Parents: Ægir, Rán; Sisters: Blóðughadda, Bylgja, Dröfn, Dúfa, Hefring, Himinglæva, Kólga, Uðr	Helgakviða Hundingsbana I, Skáldskaparmál
Hrossþjófr	"Horse-thief"		Parents: Hrímnir, Hyrja; Siblings: Feima, Heiðr, Hljóð, Kleima	Hyndluljóð, Nafnaþulur
Hrotti				Vilhjalms saga sjóðs
Hrúga	pile, heap			Nafnaþulur
Hrungerdr				
Hrungnir	"Brawler"	None attested	None attested	Nafnaþulur, Skáldskaparmál, Vilhjalms saga sjóðs
Hryggða	sadness, pain			Nafnaþulur
Hrymr	"Decrepit"	None attested	None attested	Gylfaginning, Vilhjalms saga sjóðs, Völuspá
Hundálfr	brave noble wolf			Nafnaþulur
Hundvis				Vilhjalms saga sjóðs
Hvalr	whale			Nafnaþulur
Hveðra	wind, stone			Nafnaþulur
Hveðrungr				Nafnaþulur
Hymir			Wife: Hroðr; Son: Tyr	Gylfaginning, Hymiskviða, Nafnaþulur
Hyndla	The lay of Hyndla	None attested	None attested	Hyndluljóð
Hyrrokkin	"Fire-Smoked"	None attested	None attested	Gylfaginning, Húsdrápa, Nafnaþulur, Skáldskaparmál

=== I ===
Name	Name meaning	Alternative names	Attested relatives	Attestations
Iði	"The moveable", "The hard-working one"	None attested	Father: Alvaldi, Greip; Brothers: Gangr, Þjazi	Nafnaþulur, Skáldskaparmál, Vilhjalms saga sjóðs
Íma	the grey one, battle			Nafnaþulur
Imðr	the grey one, battle	None attested	Father: Geirröðr; Sisters: Angeyja, Atla, Eistla, Eyrgjafa, Gjálp, Greip, Járnsaxa, Ulfrún; Partner: Odin; Son: Heimdallr	Gylfaginning, Heimdalargaldr, Nafnaþulur, Skáldskaparmál, Völuspá hin skamma
Ímgerðr				Nafnaþulur
Ímr	the dark looking	None attested	Father: Vafþrúðnir	Nafnaþulur, Skaldskaparmal, Vafþrúðnismál
Irpa	the dark coloured		Sister: Þorgerðr Hölgabrúðr	
Íviðja	forest dweller, the evil, enveloper			Nafnaþulur

=== J ===
Name	Name meaning	Alternative names	Attested relatives	Attestations
Járnglumra	iron sound			Nafnaþulur
Járnsaxa	"Iron dagger"	Iarnsaxa	Father: Geirröðr; Sisters: Angeyja, Atla, Eistla, Eyrgjafa, Gjálp, Greip, Imðr, Ulfrún; Partners: Odin, Thor; Sons: Heimdallr, Magni, Móði	Gylfaginning, Heimdalargaldr, Hyndluljóð, Nafnaþulur, Skáldskaparmál, Völuspá hin skamma
Járnviðja	"Ironwoodite"	None attested	None attested	Gylfaginning, Háleygjatal, Nafnaþulur
Jörð	"Earth"	Fjörgyn, Hlóðyn	Parents: Annar, Nótt; Partner: Odin; Sons: Thor, Meili	
Jörmungandr	"Huge monster"	Miðgarðsormr	Parents: Loki, Angrboda; Siblings: Fenrir, Hel; Half-siblings: Narfi, Váli, Sleipnir	
Jötunn	giant, eater			Nafnaþulur

=== K ===
Name	Name meaning	Alternative names	Attested relatives	Attestations
Kaldgrani	cold horse, cold mustache			Nafnaþulur
Kampa				Vilhjalms saga sjóðs
Kári	wind gust, curly		Father: Fornjótr; Brothers: Ægir, Logi; Son: Frosti	Hversu Noregr byggðist, Orkneyinga saga
Keila	"A narrow strait of water", rock chasm			Skáldskaparmál
Kjallandi				Nafnaþulur, Skáldskaparmál
Kjaptlangur				Vilhjalms saga sjóðs
Klumba				Vilhjalms saga sjóðs
Kolfrosti				Vilhjalms saga sjóðs
Kólga	"Cool"	None attested	Parents: Ægir, Rán; Sisters: Blóðughadda, Bylgja, Dröfn, Dúfa, Hefring, Himinglæva, Hrönn, Uðr	Helgakviða Hundingsbana I, Skáldskaparmál
Költr				
Köttr	cat			Nafnaþulur
Krabbi				Vilhjalms saga sjóðs
Kráka	crow			Nafnaþulur
Kyrmir	yeller			Nafnaþulur

=== L ===
Name	Name meaning	Alternative names	Attested relatives	Attestations
Laufey		Nál	Husband: Fárbauti; Sons: Býleistr, Helblindi, Loki	Gylfaginning, Hjálmþés saga ok Ölvis, Skádskaparmál
Leiði	good wind, reluctance, journey			Skáldskaparmál
Leifi	leave, smear			Nafnaþulur
Leikn	witch	None attested	None attested	Nafnaþulur, Skáldskaparmál
Leirvör				Nafnaþulur
Litr	colour. looks, shape, oar	Lútr		Ragnarsdrápa, Skáldskaparmál
Ljóta	ugly, terrible			Nafnaþulur
Ljotur				Vilhjalms saga sjóðs
Loðinfingra	hairy finger			Nafnaþulur
Loðinn				Helgakviða Hjörvarðssonar
Logi	"Fire"	Hálogi	Father: Fornjótr; Brothers: Ægir, Kári; Wife: Glöð; Daughters: Eisa, Eimyrja	
Loki	Contested	Hvedrung, Loptr	Parents: Fárbauti, Laufey; Brothers: Býleistr, Helblindi; Partners: Sigyn, Angrboda, Svaðilfari; Children: Narfi, Váli, Fenrir, Jörmungandr, Hel, Sleipnir	

=== M ===
Name	Name meaning	Alternative names	Attested relatives	Attestations
Margerðr				Hjálmþés saga ok Ölvis, Nafnaþulur
Menja			Sister: Fenja	Grottasöngr, Vilhjalms saga sjóðs
Miði	center, fishing ground			Nafnaþulur
Miðjungr	the middle, man			Nafnaþulur
Miðvitnir	"Mead wolf", "Mid wolf" or "Sea wolf"	None attested	Son: Sökkmímir	Grímnismál
Mímir		Heidraupnir (supposed), Hoddmimir (supposed), Hoddrofnir (supposed)	Father: Bölþorn; Sister: Bestla	Gylfaginning, Heimskringla, Nafnaþulur, Sigrdrífumál, Skáldskaparmál, Völuspá
Miskorblindi			Son: Aegir	Hymiskviða
Mjǫll	"Powdered Snow"	None attested	Father: Snær; Siblings: Thorri, Fǫnn, Drífa; Consorts: Dumbr, Rauðfeldr; Sons: Bárðr, Þorkell	Bárðar saga Snæfellsáss, Hversu Noregr byggðist
Móðguðr	"Furious Battler"	None attested	None attested	Gylfaginning
Moðir				Vilhjalms saga sjóðs
Mögþrasir	"The one who is striving for sons"	None attested	None attested	Vafþrúðnismál
Mokkurkalfi	fog calf	None attested	None attested	Skáldskaparmál
Mörn				Nafnaþulur
Mundilfari	""the one moving according to particular times"	Mundilföri, Mundilfœri, Mundilfær	Wife: Glaur; Children: Sigel, Mani	
Munnharpa	’Mouth Harp’, mouth witch, hole harp/witch			Nafnaþulur
Myrkriða	’Dark Rider’			Nafnaþulur

=== N ===
Name	Name meaning	Alternative names	Attested relatives	Attestations
Naglfari	nail farer	None attested	Wife: Nótt; Son: Auðr	Gylfaginning
Narfi		Nörr	Daughter: Nótt	Forspjallsljóð, Gylfaginning, Helgakviða Hundingsbana I, Höfuðlausn, Sonatorrek, Vafþrúðnismál
Nari	corpse	Narfi	Parents: Loki, Sigyn; Brother: Váli; Half-siblings: Fenrir, Jörmungandr, Hel, Sleipnir	Gylfaginning, Haustlöng, Lokasenna, Skáldskaparmál, Ynglingatal
Nati	spear	None attested	None attested	Nafnaþulur
Nefja				Hjálmþés saga ok Ölvis
Nótt	"Night"	None attested	Father: Narfi; Partners: Naglfari, Annar, Dellingr; Children: Auðr, Jörð, Dagr	Alvíssmál, Gylfaginning, Sigrdrífumál, Skáldskaparmál, Vafþrúðnismál

=== O ===
Name	Name meaning	Alternative names	Attested relatives	Attestations
Öflugbarða	strong axe			Nafnaþulur
Ǫflugbarði	strong axe	None attested	None attested	Ragnarsdrápa
Ófóti	without feet		Son: Brûsi	Ketils saga hœngs, Nafnaþulur, Orm Storolfsson
Óglaðnir	not glad, not gleaming			Nafnaþulur
Önduðr				Nafnaþulur
Opingeil				Vilhjalms saga sjóðs
Ösgrúi				Nafnaþulur
Öskruðr	"Yeller"	None attested	None attested	Nafnaþulur

=== R ===
Name	Name meaning	Alternative names	Attested relatives	Attestations
Rangbeinn	"Bent bone" or "Bowlegged"	None attested	None attested	Nafnaþulur
Raun				Hjálmþés saga ok Ölvis
Rifingöflu	sword strong	None attested	None attested	Nafnaþulur
Rindr		None attested	Partner: Odin; Son: Váli	Baldrs draumar, Gesta Danorum, Grógaldr, Gylfaginning, Sigurðardrápa
Rýgi	wooly, wool plucker, roarer	None attested	None attested	Nafnaþulur

=== S ===
Name	Name meaning	Alternative names	Attested relatives	Attestations
Sækarlsmúli	"Seaman's mouth" or "Seaman's nose"	None attested	None attested	Nafnaþulur
Salfangr	"Bargain grasper" or "Hall robber"	None attested	None attested	Nafnaþulur
Sámendill	"Familiar foe"	None attested	None attested	Nafnaþulur
Saurkver				Vilhjalms saga sjóðs
Sidhauttur				Vilhjalms saga sjóðs
Sigyn	"Victorious girl-friend"	None attested	Husband: Loki; Sons: Nari, Váli	Gylfaginning, Haustlöng, Lokasenna, Skáldskaparmál, Völuspá
Sinmara	Contested	None attested	Husband: Surtr (supposed)	Fjölsvinnsmál
Simul				Nafnaþulur
Sívör				Nafnaþulur
Skaði			Father: Þjazi; Husband: Njörðr	Grímnismál, Gylfaginning, Heimskringla, Hyndluljóð, Lokasenna, Skáldskaparmál
Skærir				Nafnaþulur
Skerkir				Nafnaþulur
Skinnbrok				Vilhjalms saga sjóðs
Skitinkjapta				Vilhjalms saga sjóðs
Sköll	"Treachery" or "Mockery"	Skalli	Father: Fenrir; Brother: Hati	Nafnaþulur
Skolli				Vilhjalms saga sjóðs
Skotti				Vilhjalms saga sjóðs
Skrati				Nafnaþulur
Skrikja	’’Screaming’’		Nafnaþulur	
Skrucka				Vilhjalms saga sjóðs
Skrýmir		None attested	None attested	Gylfaginning, Nafnaþulur
Slammi				Vilhjalms saga sjóðs
Slangi				Vilhjalms saga sjóðs
Slauttur				Vilhjalms saga sjóðs
Slinni				Vilhjalms saga sjóðs
Smortur				Vilhjalms saga sjóðs
Snarinefja				Vilhjalms saga sjóðs
Snær			Father: Frosti	Annals of Lund, Annales Ryensis, Chronicon Lethrense, Gesta Danorum, Hversu Noregr byggdist, Orkneyinga saga, Ynglinga saga
Snodvis				Vilhjalms saga sjóðs
Sökkmímir		None attested	Father: Miðvitnir	Grímnismál, Nafnaþulur, Ynglingatal
Sómr				Nafnaþulur
Sprettingr				Nafnaþulur
Stalhaus				Vilhjalms saga sjóðs
Starkad			Grandfather: Starkad Aludreng; Father: Stórverkr; Foster father: Hrosshárs-Grani (Odin)	Gautreks saga, Gesta Danorum, Hervarar saga, Historia de gentibus septentrionalibus, Norna-Gests þáttr, Skáldskaparmál, Sögubrot, Ynglinga saga
Stigandi				Nafnaþulur, Sturlu þáttr
Stórverkr				Nafnaþulur, Vilhjalms saga sjóðs
Stritramur				Vilhjalms saga sjóðs
Stúmi		Stunni		Nafnaþulur
Sulki				Vilhjalms saga sjóðs
Surtr	"Black" or "The swarthy one"	Surti, Surt	Wife: Sinmara (supposed)	Fáfnismál, Fjölsvinnsmál, Gylfaginning, Nafnaþulur, Skáldskaparmál, Vafþrúðnismál, Vilhjalms saga sjóðs, Völuspá
Suttungr			Father: Gillingr; Brother: Baugi; Daughter: Gunnlöð	Nafnaþulur, Skáldskaparmál
Svárangr				Nafnaþulur
Svartbrun				Vilhjalms saga sjóðs
Svartr	’’Black’’		Nafnaþulur	
Svásuðr	"Mild-One"	Svasud, Suasuthur	Son: Sumarr	Gylfaginning, Nafnaþulur, Skáldskaparmál, Vafþrúðnismál
Sveipinfalda				Nafnaþulur
Svelnir				Vilhjalms saga sjóðs
Svivor	"Shame-lips" or "Shame Goddess"			Skáldskaparmál
Syrpa				Vilhjalms saga sjóðs

=== T ===
Name	Name meaning	Alternative names	Attested relatives	Attestations
Þistilbarði	"Thistle-beard"	None attested	None attested	Nafnaþulur
Þjazi			Parents: Alvaldi, Greip; Brothers: Gangr, Iði; Daughter: Skadi	Haustlöng, Skáldskaparmál
Þökk	"Thanks"	Loki (supposed)	None attested	Gylfaginning
Thorn	thorn, needle			
Þorgerðr Hölgabrúðr			Sister: Irpa	
Trana				Hjálmþés saga ok Ölvis
Thrasir	assault, storm			
Þrígeitir	three goat			Nafnaþulur
Þrívaldi	"Thrice mighty"	None attested	None attested	Nafnaþulur, Skáldskaparmál
Þrúðgelmir	"Strength Yeller"	None attested	Father: Ymir; Son: Bergelmir	Nafnaþulur, Vafþrúðnismál
Þrymr	"Uproar"	None attested	Son: Bergfinnr	Hversu Noregr byggðist, Nafnaþulur, Þrymskviða, Vilhjalms saga sjóðs
Þurbörð				Nafnaþulur
Tuska				Vilhjalms saga sjóðs
Tyrnir				

=== U ===
Name	Name meaning	Alternative names	Attested relatives	Attestations
Ulfrún	"Wolf rune" or "wolf-woman"	None attested	Father: Geirröðr; Sisters: Angeyja, Atla, Eistla, Eyrgjafa, Gjálp, Greip, Imðr, Járnsaxa, Ulfrún; Partner: Odin; Son: Heimdallr	Gylfaginning, Heimdalargaldr, Skáldskaparmál, Völuspá hin skamma
Uðr	"Foaming"	Unnr	Parents: Ægir, Rán; Sisters: Blóðughadda, Bylgja, Dröfn, Dúfa, Hefring, Himinglæva, Hrönn, Kólga	Helgakviða Hundingsbana I, Skáldskaparmál
Útgarða-Loki	"Loki of the Outyards"			Gesta Danorum, Gylfaginning

=== V ===
Name	Name meaning	Alternative names	Attested relatives	Attestations
Vafþrúðnir	"Mighty Weaver" or "Mighty in riddles"			Nafnaþulur, Vafþrúðnismál
Vagnhöfði	"Swordfish-Head"	None attested	Daughter: Harðgreipr; Foster son: Hadding	Gesta Danorum, Nafnaþulur, Vilhjalms saga sjóðs
Váli			Parents: Loki, Sigyn; Brother: Narfi; Half-siblings: Fenrir, Jörmungandr, Hel, Sleipnir	Gylfaginning
Vandill				Nafnaþulur
Varðrún				Nafnaþulur
Vaulsi				Vilhjalms saga sjóðs
Vásuðr	"Wet and Sleety"	None attested	Son: Vindsvalr	
Verr				Nafnaþulur
Víðblindi	"Very blind"	None attested	None attested	Laufás-Edda, Nafnaþulur, Skáldskaparmál
Viddi				Nafnaþulur
Víðgrípr				Nafnaþulur
Vidgymnir				
Vígglöð				Nafnaþulur
Vindr	’’Wind’’		Nafnaþulur	
Vindloni				
Vindsvalr	"Wind-cool"	Vindljóni	Father: Vásuðr; Son: Vetr	Gylfaginning, Nafnaþulur, Skáldskaparmál, Vafþrúðnismál
Vingnir			Wife: Hlóra; Foster son: Thor	Haustlöng, Nafnaþulur, Skáldskaparmál
Vingrip				
Víparr		Viporr		Nafnaþulur
Vörnir		None attested	None attested	Nafnaþulur

=== Y ===
Name	Name meaning	Alternative names	Attested relatives	Attestations
Yma		None attested		Hjálmþés saga ok Ölvis
Ymir	"seething clay"	Aurgelmir, Bláinn, Brimir, Ogelmir	Son: Þrúðgelmir	Grímnismál, Gylfaginning, Hyndluljóð, Nafnaþulur, Skáldskaparmál, Vafþrúðnismál, Völuspá
Ymsi		None attested	None attested	Þórsdrápa
Ysia				Vilhjalms saga sjóðs
Ysporta				Vilhjalms saga sjóðs
