= Gjálp and Greip =

Norse mythic characters

Gjálp (Old Norse: [ˈɡjɑːlp]; or Gialp) and Greip (Old Norse: Greip) are two jötnar in Norse mythology and the daughters of the jötunn Geirröðr. They are killed by the thunder god Thor for trying to kill him.

== Names ==
The Old Norse name Gjálp has been variously translated as 'screamer', 'yelper'. It is related to the Icelandic gjálp ('roar; sea, wave'), and to the Old Norse gjalpa ('to brag').

Greip is translated as ('gripper, grasper'). It derives from the Old Norse greip ('hand [with spread thumbs], handle').

== Attestations ==
=== Prose Edda ===
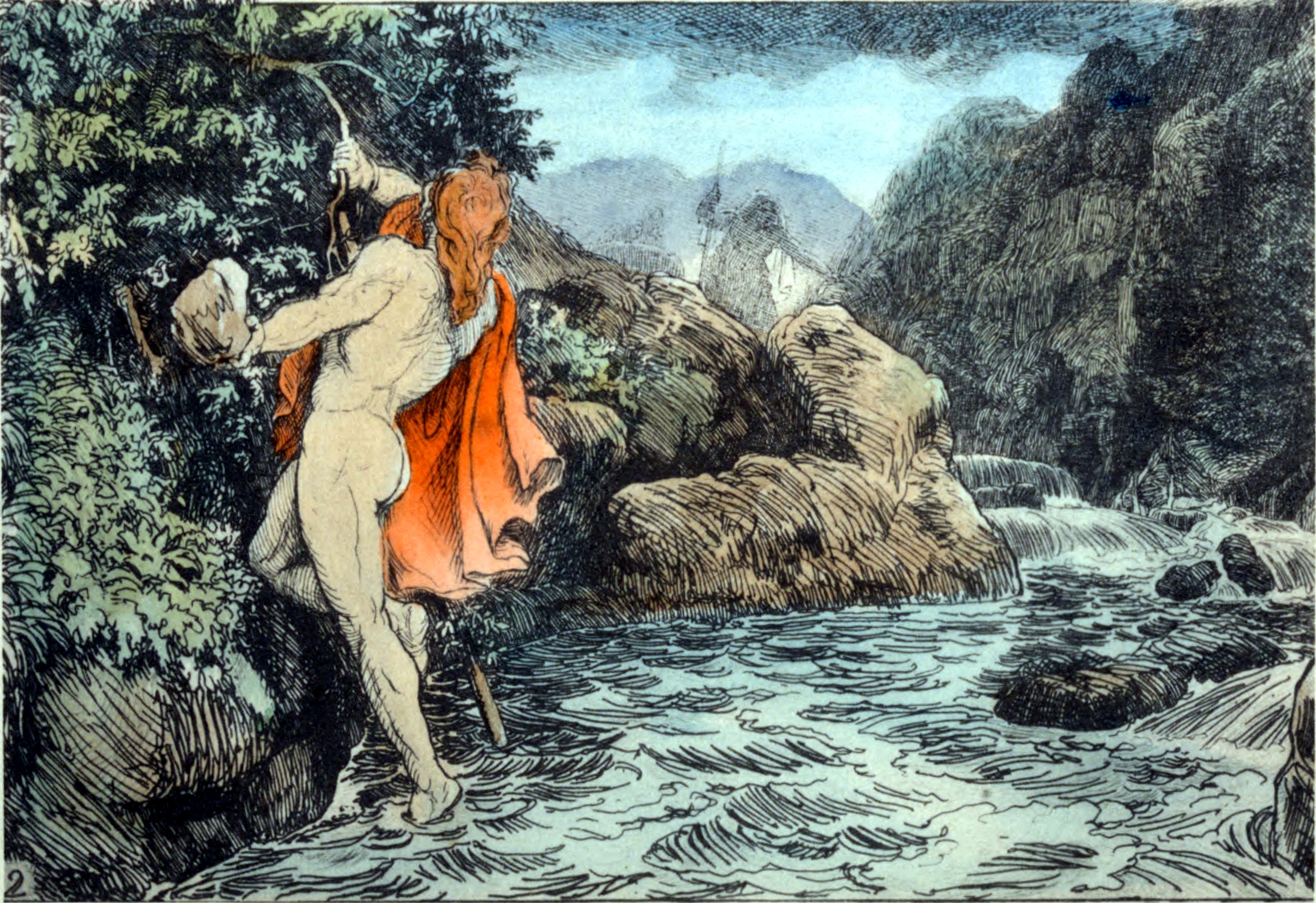
Thor's Journey to Geirrodsgard (1906) by Lorenz Frølich.

In Skáldskaparmál (The Language of Poetry), Thor meets Gjálp as he is trying to wade across the Vimur River; she is causing the river to swell with what appears to be her urine or menstrual fluids as she is standing "astride the river".

Then Thor saw up in a certain cleft that Geirrod’s daughter Gialp was standing astride the river and she was causing it to rise. Then Thor took up out of the river a great stone and threw it at her and said:
'At its outlet must a river be stemmed.'

He did not miss what he was aiming at, and at that moment he found himself close to the bank and managed to grasp a sort of rowan-bush and thus climbed out of the river.

— Snorri Sturluson, Skáldskaparmál, 18, trans. A. Faulkes, 1987.

Thor eventually reaches Geirrödargardar, the abode of the jötunn Geirröðr. He sits on a chair that is lifted up against the roof by Gjálp and Greip as they are trying to kill him.

And when Thor got to Geirrod’s, he and his companion were first of all shown into a goat-shed as their lodging, and inside there was a single seat to sit on and it was Thor who sat on it. Then he realized that the seat was lifting under him up towards the roof. He pushed Grid’s pole up into the rafters and pressed himself hard down on the seat. Then there was a great crack accompanied by a great scream. Under the seat it had been Geirrod’s daughters Gialp and Greip and he had broken both their backs.

— Snorri Sturluson, Skáldskaparmál, 18, trans. A. Faulkes, 1987.

=== Viking Age ===
The same myth is told in Þórsdrápa by Eilífr Goðrúnarson (late 10th c. AD), which is cited by Snorri Sturluson in Skáldskaparmál, although the gýgjar are not named in the poem.

And they pressed their eye-lash-moon-flame-[eye-]sky [skull] against the roof-battens of the stone-plain’s [mountain’s] hall [cave]. The females were trodden down by long swords. The driver [Thor] of the hull of the storm’s hover- chariot broke each of the cave-women’s age-old laughter-ship-[breast-]keels [backbones].

— Eilífr Goðrúnarson, Þórsdrápa, trans. A. Faulkes, 1987.

=== Gesta Danorum ===
Gesta Danorum (Deeds of the Danes) relates a similar story as Thorkillus (Thokil) and his companions are visiting the hall of the dead Geruthus (Geirröðr) when they notice the pierced body of an old man and three dead women with their backs broken. Thokil tells them that the god Thor "has driven a burning ingot though the vitals of Geirrœth" and that the "women have been struck by the force of Thor’s thunderbolt and have paid the penalty for attacking his divinity by having their bodies broken".

They saw also three women, their bodies laden with tumours and, so it seemed, with no strength in their backbones, occupying adjacent couches.

— Saxo Grammaticus, Gesta Danorum, 8:14:15, trans. P. Fisher, 2015.

=== Other texts ===
In Völuspá hin skamma (37), Gjálp and Greip are listed among the Nine Mothers of Heimdallr. Gjálp is also mentioned in the þulur and in kennings of skaldic poetry. Greip on her side is not mentioned in Nafnaþulur and found only once in the skaldic kenning.

In Haustlöng, Þjazi is called "the son of the suitor of Greip". Greip may be used there as a generic gýgr name and the kenning may mean simply "jötunn".

In a lausavísa composed by Vetrliði Sumarliðason and quoted in Skáldskaparmál, Gjálp is mentioned as being killed by Thor.

Leggi brauzt þú Leiknar, *lamðir Þrívalda, steypðir *Starkeði, stóttu of Gjálp dauða. – Faulkes' edition	Thou didst break the leg of Leikn, Didst cause to stoop Starkadr, Didst bruise Thrívaldi, Didst stand on lifeless Gjálp. – Brodeur's translation
