= Nine Mothers of Heimdallr =

Group of characters in Norse mythology

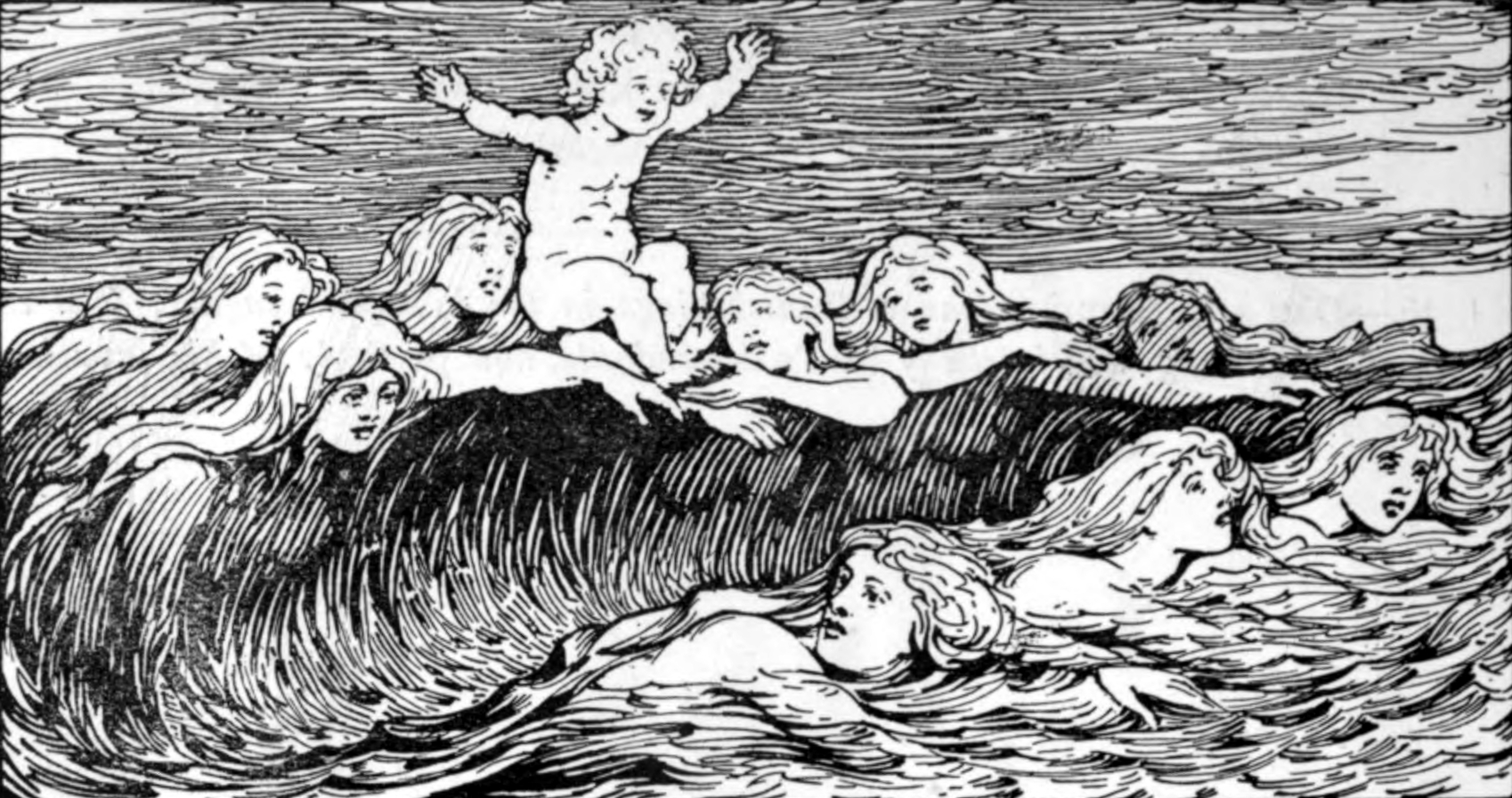
Heimdal and his Nine Mothers by W. G. Collingwood (1908), in which Heimdallr's nine mothers are depicted as sea waves

In Norse mythology, the Nine Mothers of Heimdallr are nine sisters who gave birth to the god Heimdallr by the god Odin. The Nine Mothers of Heimdallr are attested in the Prose Edda, written in the 13th century by Snorri Sturluson; in the poetry of skalds; and possibly also in a poem in the Poetic Edda, a book of poetry compiled in the 13th century from earlier traditional material. Scholars have debated what being "born of nine mothers" implies and have sought to connect the notion to other European folk motifs. Scholars have theorized that Heimdallr's Nine Mothers could be the Nine Daughters of Ægir and Rán, goddesses and personifications of the sea waves. In turn, Heimdallr would be born of the sea.

== Attestations ==
The Nine Mothers of Heimdallr are mentioned in two books of the Prose Edda; Gylfaginning and Skáldskaparmál. In Gylfaginning, Heimdallr is introduced in chapter 27, where the enthroned figure of High tells the disguised mythical king Gangleri details about the god. Among other details, High says that Heimdallr is the son of nine sisters and, as a reference, provides two lines of the (otherwise now lost) poem Heimdalargaldr, in which Heimdallr says that he was born of nine sisters:

"Offspring of nine mothers am I and of nine sisters am I the son".

In chapter 16 of Skáldskaparmál a work by the 10th century skald Úlfr Uggason is quoted. The poem refers to Heimdallr as the "son of eight mothers plus one". Prose following the poem points out that the poem refers to Heimdallr as the son of nine mothers.

The poem Völuspá hin skamma (contained within the poem Hyndluljóð, often considered a part of the Poetic Edda) contains three stanza that scholars have frequently theorized as referring to Heimdallr and his nine mothers. According to the stanzas, long ago, a mighty god was born by nine jötnar maidens at the edge of the world. This boy grew strong, nourished by the strength of the earth, the ice-cold sea, and the blood of swine. Names are provided for these nine maidens. For discussion of these names, see Names section below (note that the translations below present anglicizations of Old Norse forms). The stanzas in question read as follows:

Benjamin Thorpe translation (1866):

There was one born, in times of old,
with wondrous might endowed, of origin divine:
nine jötun maids gave birth, to the gracious god,
at the world's margin.
Giâlp gave him birth, Greip gave him birth,
Eistla gave him birth, and Eyrgiafa;
Ulfrûn gave him birth, and Angeyia,
Imd and Atla, and Iârnsaxa.
The boy was nourished with the strength of the earth,
with the ice-cold sea, and with Sôn's blood.

Henry Adams Bellows translation (1923):

One there was born in the bygone days,
Of the race of the gods, and great was his might;
Nine giant women, at the world's edge,
Once bore the man so might in arms.
Gjolp there bore him, Greip there bore him,
Eistla bore him, and Eyrgjafa,
Ulfrun bore him, and Angeyja,
Imth and Atla, and Jarnsaxa.
Strong was he made with the strength of the earth,
With the ice-cold sea, and the blood of swine.

Jeramy Dodds translation (2014):

One was born in olden days,
endowed with power from the gods.
Nine jotun maids carried him,
a spear-splendid man, along the Earth's edge.
Gjalp bore him, Greip bore him,
Eistla bore him and Eyrgjafa,
Ulfrun and Angeyja, Imd,
Atla and Jarnsaxa.
He was endowed with the Earth's power,
with the cold sea, with boar's blood.

== Names ==
Some of the names of Heimdallr's mothers found in Völuspá hin skamma appear in a variety of other sources, where they may or may not refer to separate entities:

Name	Meaning	Notes
Angeyja, Augeia, Sangríðr or Sangridr	Angeyja means "The Stalker One", while Sangríðr means "The Punish One"	
Atla	"The Furious One"	Name appears listed among jötnar in the Nafnaþulur
Eistla or Egia	"Tempest"	
Eyrgjafa or Aurgiafa	"The Earth Giver One"	
Gjálp	"Roar"	The name Gjálp appears frequently for jötnar in the Old Norse corpus. Gjálp and Greip appear together as names of the daughters of the jötunn Geirröðr in Skáldskaparmál. Gjálp attempted to kill Thor by causing a river to swell.
Greip	"Grip"	The name Greip appears frequently for jötnar in the Old Norse corpus. Gjálp and Greip appear together as names of the daughters of the jötunn Geirröðr in Skáldskaparmál. Greip attempted to kill Thor by knocking down the stones of a mountain.
Imðr, Imdr or Sindur	"The Dusky One"	
Járnsaxa or Iarnsaxa	"Iron Sword"	Name appears listed among the jötnar in the Nafnaþulur and the name refers to an apparently separate figure with whom the god Thor is the mother of Magni and the possible mother of Móði
Ulfrún	"Wolf Woman"	Occurs as an Old Norse female personal name.

== Scholarly reception and interpretation ==
The names of all nine mothers mentioned above in Völuspá hin skamma appear elsewhere as the names of female jötnar (generally in the þulur). Adding to the confusion, Orchard points out, Gjálp and Greip are otherwise mentioned as jötnar maidens who seek to contravene the god Thor from reaching their father Geirröðr, and Járnsaxa is otherwise the mother of Magni and Móði by Thor.

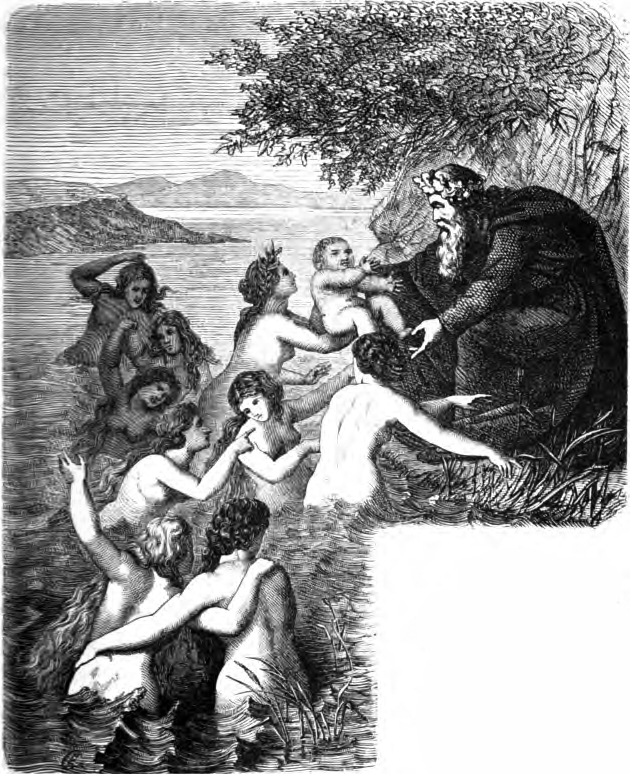
Heimdallr lifted by the Nine Wave Maidens by Karl Ehrenberg (1882), depicts Heimdallr's mothers as "wave maidens"

Some scholars have linked the Nine Mothers of Heimdallr with the Nine Daughters of Ægir and Rán (nine goddesses who personify the sea waves), an identification that would mean that Heimdallr was thus born from the waves of the sea. However, this connection has been questioned on the grounds that the names presented for the Nine Daughters of Ægir and Rán and the Nine Mothers of Heimdallr (as found in Völuspá hin skamma) do not match. Scholar John Lindow comments that the identification of Heimdallr's mothers as Ægir and Rán's daughters do, however, match on the grounds that Ægir and Rán's daughters, like Heimdallr's mothers, are sisters, and that two separate traditions about Heimdallr's mothers may explain the differences between the two sisterhoods.

== See also ==
- Nine Daughters of Ægir and Rán
- Rhinemaidens
- Nine sorceresses
