= Hroðr =

Norse mythical character

Hróðr (Old Norse: [ˈhroːðz̠] "famed") is a female jötunn in Norse mythology, mentioned in the Eddic poem Hymiskviða, in which Thor is referred to as "Hróðr's adversary." But the context is unclear, so the name could equally refer to an otherwise unknown giantess adversary of Thor, of which many are mentioned in other sources such as Hárbarðsljóð.

Some readings of Hymiskviða have identified Hróðr as the name of the mother of Týr, who appears in the poem, a giantess friendly to the Æsir and the wife of the jötunn Hymir. If Hróðr is Tyr's mother, the poem suggests that Hymir is the father, but the later Prose Edda states that Odin is his father. Since fosterage of hero figures by giantesses is a common trope in Norse folklore, Hymir could be a foster-father, an important relationship in Viking culture.

== Name ==
The Old Norse name hróðr has been translated as 'glorious, famed'.
