= Víðblindi =

Figure in Nordic mythology

Víðblindi or Viðblindi ("Very blind") is a jötunn in Norse mythology.

== Attestations ==
The skald Hallar-Steinn uses the kenning "Viðblindi's boar" (Viðblinda gǫltr) for whale in a stanza quoted by Snorri Sturluson in his Skáldskaparmál. Snorri explains it as follows:

Here the whale is called Boar of Viðblindi; this Viðblindi was a giant who drew whales out of the sea like fishes.

—Skáldskaparmál (XLVI), Brodeur's translation

A similar kenning for whale, "Víðblindi's pig" (Old Norse: Víðblinda svín), can be found in an anonymous stanza from the 13th century preserved in Laufás-Edda.

Víðblindi is also listed among the jötnar in the þulur.

== Interpretation and discussion ==
Rudolf Simek noted that the only jötunn known for fishing whales is Hymir, but he is never called Víðblindi / Viðblindi.
