= Bergelmir =

Norse mythical character

Bergelmir (/bɛərˈɡɛlmɪər/ bair-GEL-meer; Old Norse: [ˈberˌɡelmez̠]) is a jötunn in Norse mythology.

== Name ==
The Old Norse name Bergelmir has been variously translated as 'bear-yeller', 'mountain-yeller', or 'bare-yeller'. According to linguist Jan de Vries, the name should be read as ber-gelmir ('who roars like a bear') rather than berg-gelmir ('who roars in the mountains').

== Attestations ==
In Vafþrúðnismál (The Lay of Vafþrúðnir), Bergelmir is portrayed as the son of Þrúðgelmir and the grandson of the first jötunn Aurgelmir (Ymir). When Odin asks Vafthrúdnir who is the oldest among the æsir and the jötnar, the wise jötunn responds that:

A great many years before the earth was formed,
Bergelmir was born;
Thrúdgelmir was the father of this one,
And Aurgelmir the grandfather.

— Vafthrúdnismál, 29, trans. J. Lindow, 2002.

In the same poem, Odin then asks Vafthrúdnir about the monstrous birth of the offspring of Aurgelmir, and Vafthrúdnir responds:

A great many years before the earth was formed,
Bergelmir was born;
What I first remember is when the wise giant
Was placed on a lúðr.

— Vafthrúdnismál, 35, trans. J. Lindow, 2002.

In Gylfaginning (The Beguiling of Gylfi), while the blood of Ymir (Aurgelmir) is flooding the earth after the sons of Borr (Odin, Vili, and Vé) have killed him, Bergelmir is likewise pictured as escaping on a lúðr with his wife to re-found the frost-jötunn race.

The sons of Bor killed Ymir the giant. And when he fell, so much blood gushed from his wounds, that with it all of the frost giants were killed, except one who got away with his family. The giants called that one Bergelmir. He got up on his lúðr along with his wife and saved himself there, and from them come the families of the frost giants.

— Gylfaginning, trans. J. Lindow, 2002.

Based upon Snorri's account, the Old Norse word lúðr might have referred to a 'coffin', a 'cradle', a 'chest', or some wooden part of a mill.

== Theories ==
Robert D. Fulk notes that Snorri's Prose Edda account "conflicts with the poetic version, as the [Prose Edda] presents a Noah-like figure, while the latter has Bergelmir laid (lagiðr) in the lúðr, implying he is an infant, as in the Scyld story. But Snorri does add the crucial element not made in the explicit verses, that the lúðr is to serve as a floating vessel."

Fulk continues that "the key word here is lúðr, which ought to refer to a flour-bin. To be precise, the object is a box or wooden trough, perhaps on legs, in which the stones of a hand-mill sit [...]. It is true that most glossators assume some meaning other than 'flour-bin' in Vafþrúðnismál and Snorra edda [an alternate name for the Prose Edda], suggesting instead something in the range of 'coffin (or cradle), chest, ark (i.e. boat)'." Fulk details that "the interpretation of 'ark' derives solely from the passage in Snorra Edda, because of Bergelmir's resemblance to Noah, and the fact that [Old Icelandic] ǫrk [...] can refer to both Noah's ark and a chest or a sarcophagus."
