= Móði and Magni =

Pair of deities in Norse mythology

In Norse mythology, Móði (Old Norse: [ˈmoːðe]; anglicized Módi or Mothi) and Magni ([ˈmɑɣne]) are the sons of Thor. Their names translate as "Wrath" and "Strength", respectively. Rudolf Simek states that, along with Thor's daughter Þrúðr ("Power"), they embody their father's features.

Móði and Magni's children from Thor is attested by the kennings "Móði's father" (faðir Móða, in Hymiskviða, 34) and "Magni's father" (faðir Magna, in Þórsdrápa and Hárbarðsljóð, 53). Snorri Sturluson confirms it (Gylfaginning, 53, Skáldskaparmál, 4). According to Skáldskaparmál (17) Magni is the son of Thor and the jötunn Járnsaxa and Móði is the son of Thor and an unnamed female jötunn (possibly Járnsaxa).

== Poetic Edda ==
The two brothers are mentioned among the survivors of Ragnarök in the Poetic Edda Vafþrúðnismál:

Móði ok Magni skulu Mjöllni hafa Vingnis at vígþroti. —Vafþrúðnismál (51), Guðni Jónsson's edition	Modi and Magni shall Mjollnir have When Vingnir falls in fight. —Vafthruthnismol (51), Bellows' translation

== Prose Edda ==
Apart from his role after Ragnarök, there is nothing we know about Móði but, in the Prose Edda book Skáldskaparmál, Magni plays a role in the myth of Thor's battle with the giant Hrungnir:

But the hammer Mjöllnir struck Hrungnir in the middle of the head, and smashed his skull into small crumbs, and he fell forward upon Thor, so that his foot lay over Thor's neck. Thjálfi struck at Mökkurkálfi, and he fell with little glory. Thereupon Thjálfi went over to Thor and would have lifted Hrungnir's foot off him, but could not find sufficient strength. Straightway all the Æsir came up, when they, learned that Thor was fallen, and would have lifted the foot from off him, and could do nothing. Then Magni came up, son of Thor and Járnsaxa: he was then three nights old; he cast the foot of Hrungnir off Thor, and spake: 'See how ill it is, father, that I came so late: I had struck this giant dead with my fist, methinks, if I had met with him.' Thor arose and welcomed his son, saying that he should surely become great; 'And I will give thee, he said, the horse Gold-Mane, which Hrungnir possessed.' Then Odin spake and said that Thor did wrong to give the good horse to the son of a giantess, and not to his father.

—Skáldskaparmál (17), Brodeur's translation

John Lindow draws a parallel between Magni and Odin's son Váli for they both have a giantess mother (Rindr for Váli) and achieve a feat at a very young age (Váli is only one day old when he kills Höðr, thus avenging Baldr's death).

== See also ==
- Alexiares and Anicetus
