= Nine Daughters of Ægir and Rán =

Norse mythological personifications of waves

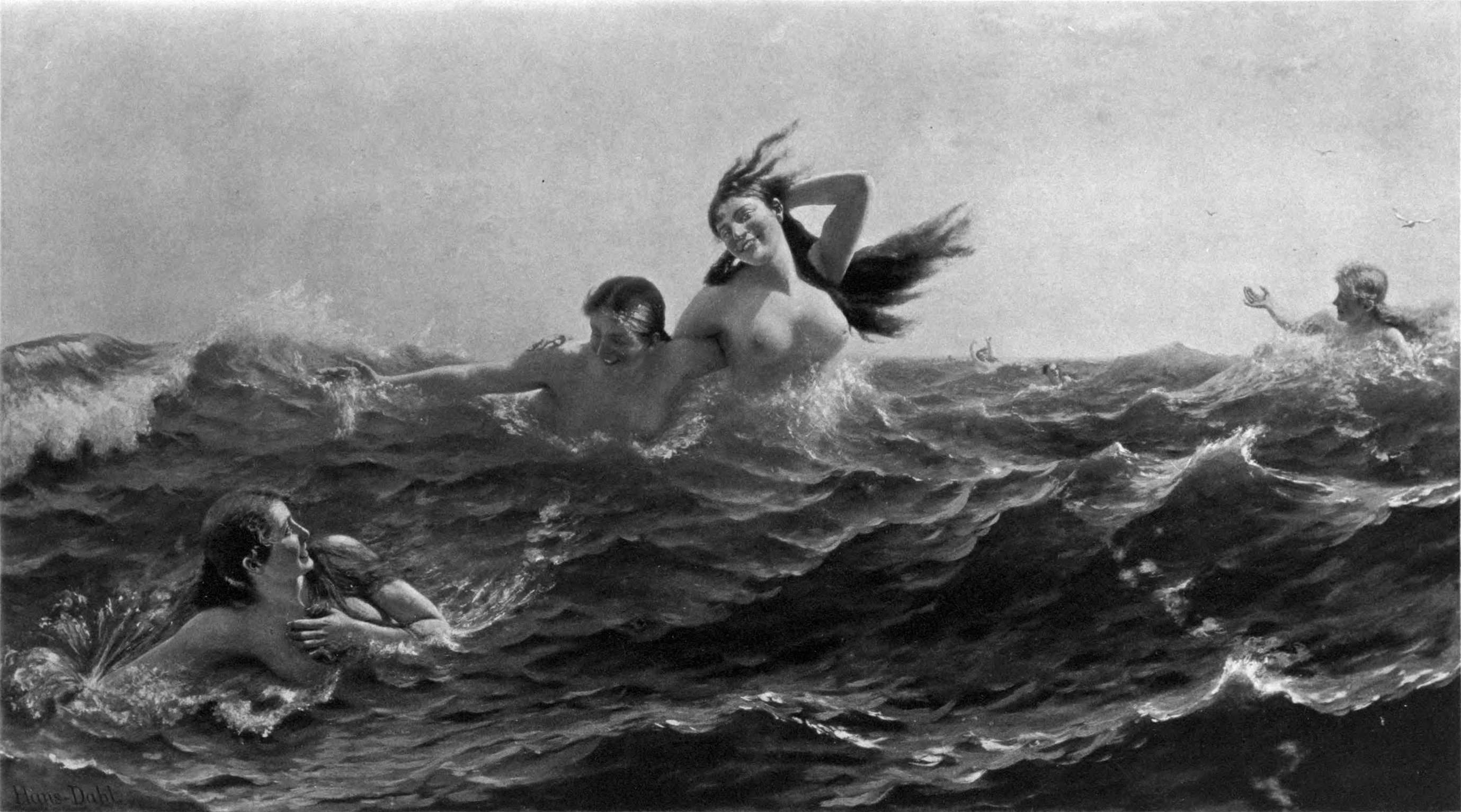
The nine daughters of Ægir and Rán by Hans Dahl (1849-1937)

In Norse mythology, the Æsir goddess Rán and the jötunn Ægir, personifications of the sea, together had nine daughters, goddesses and personifications of the sea waves, the names of their daughters are poetic terms for sea waves. The sisters are attested in the Poetic Edda, compiled in the 13th century from earlier traditional sources; the Prose Edda, composed in the 13th century; and in the poetry of skalds. Scholars have theorized that these daughters may be the same figures as the nine mothers of the god Heimdallr.

== Attestations ==
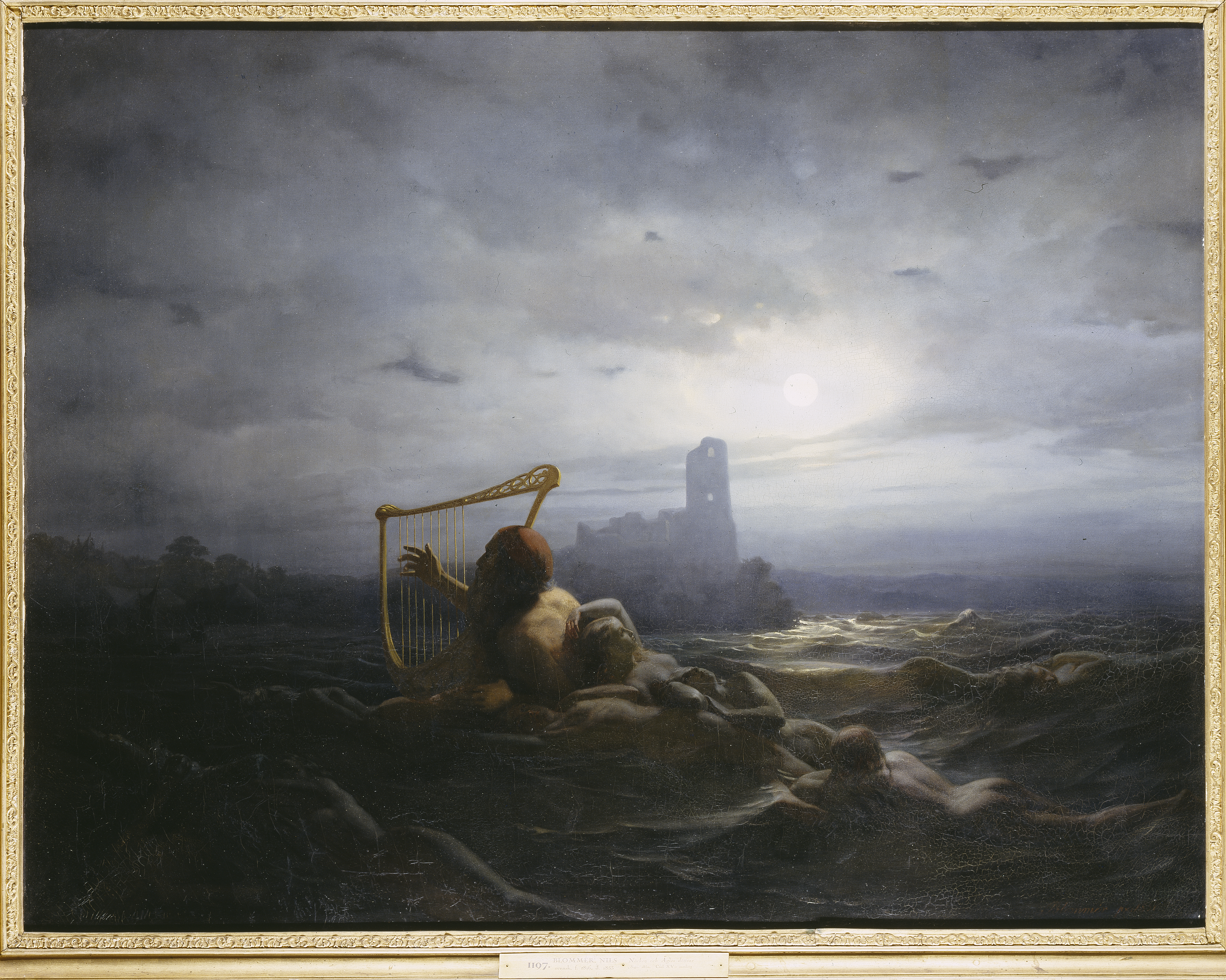
The neck and Ægir's wave daughters by Nils Blommér (1850), based on a poem by Arvid August Afzelius.

=== Poetic Edda ===
References to the waves as "Ægir's daughters" appear in the Poetic Edda. The poem Helgakviða Hundingsbana I describes how the hero Helgi's boat crashes through intense seas, in doing so referencing Rán, Ægir, and their daughters as personifications of the sea. For example, two sequential stanzas reference the wave daughters:

Once the longships regrouped, only
Kólga's sisters could be heard crashing.
a sound as if swells and bluffs were bursting.
Helgi had the high sails heightened,
the unfailing crew rallying through
the rollers, Ægir's dreaded daughters trying
to overthrow their stay-bridled sea-steeds.

=== Prose Edda ===
The daughters are mentioned several times in the Prose Edda. Section 25 of Skáldskaparmál ("How shall sea be referred to?") collects manners in which poets may refer to the sea, including "husband of Ran" and "land of Ran and of Ægir's daughters", but also "father of Ægir's daughters". The section contains the first of two instances of a list of the wave daughters (for discussion regarding their names, see Name section below).

In chapter 61 of the Nafnaþulur subsection of Skáldskaparmál, the author again recounts the names of the nine daughters with a slight variation (here Dröfn is replaced with Bára).

== Names ==
The names of Ægir and Rán's daughters occur commonly in Old Norse sources. Lists of their names appear twice in Skáldskaparmál, a section of the Prose Edda (for detail, see Prose Edda section above).

Name	Meaning	Notes
Blóðughadda or Blódughadda	"Bloody Hair"	According to scholar John Lindow this name "[refers] to reddish foam atop a wave". Scholar Rudolf Simek says that "the name does not appear to be too appropriate for a wave, but perhaps it was supposed to convey the wispy, thread-like appearance of the water streaming from the crest of the wave."
Bylgja	"The Wavy One"	Employed as a common noun
Dröfn or Bára	Dröfn means "Turbulent Wave", while Bára means "Breaking Wave"	Bára replaces Dröfn in a list of the daughter in Skáldskaparmál. Dröfn also appears as a common noun.
Dúfa or Dúva	"The Sinker One"	
Hefring or Hevring	"The Rises One"	
Himinglæva or Himinglava	"Brilliant Sky"	
Hrönn	"The Fast One"	Employed as a common noun
Kólga	"The Cold One"	
Uðr, Udr, Unn or Unnr	"Foam"	Employed as a common noun, also appears as a name for Odin and as the name of a river

== Scholarly reception and interpretation ==
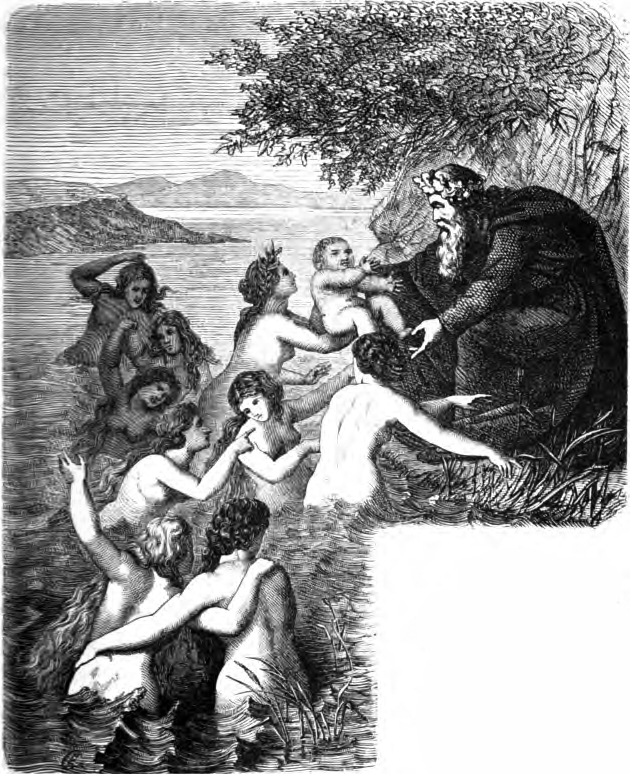
Heimdallr lifted by the Nine Wave Maidens by Karl Ehrenberg (1882), depicts Heimdallr's mothers as "wave maidens"

Some scholars have linked the Nine Daughters of Ægir and Rán with the Nine Mothers of Heimdallr, an identification that would mean that Heimdallr was thus born from the waves of the sea. However, this connection has been questioned on the grounds that the names presented for the Nine Daughters of Ægir and Rán and the Nine Mothers of Heimdallr (as listed in Völuspá hin skamma) do not match. Scholar John Lindow comments that the identification of Heimdallr's mothers as Ægir and Rán's daughters do, however, match on the grounds that Ægir and Rán's daughters, like Heimdallr's mothers, are sisters, and that two separate traditions about Heimdallr's mothers may explain the differences between the two sisterhoods.

== See also ==
- Nine Mothers of Heimdallr
- Muses
- Oceanids
