= Þrúðgelmir =

Figure in Nordic mythology

In Norse mythology, Þrúðgelmir (Old Norse pronunciation: [ˈθruːð.ɟɛlmɪr]; Old Norse "Strength Yeller") is a jötunn, the son of the primordial jötunn Aurgelmir (who Snorri Sturluson in Gylfaginning identifies with Ymir), and the father of Bergelmir. Þrúðgelmir had one brother and one sister, who were elder than he was. Þrúðgelmir's name is sometimes anglicized as Thrudgelmir. He may have been the jötunn born from Ymir's legs.

== Attestations ==
Þrúðgelmir appears in the poem Vafþrúðnismál from the Poetic Edda. When Odin (speaking under the assumed name Gagnrad) asks who was the eldest of the Æsir or of the jötnar in bygone days, Vafþrúðnir answers:

"Uncountable winters before the earth was made,
then Bergelmir was born,
Thrudgelmir was his father,
and Aurgelmir his grandfather."

—Vafþrúðnismál (29)

According to Rudolf Simek, Þrúðgelmir is identical to the six-headed son that was begotten by Aurgelmir's feet (Vafþrúðnismál, 33), but the fact that (apart from the þulur) he is mentioned in only one source led John Lindow to suggest that he might have been invented by the poet. Additionally, the identification of one with the other cannot be established with certainty since, according to stanza 33, Aurgelmir had more than one direct male offspring:

"They said that under the frost-giant's arms
a girl and boy grew together;
one foot with the other, of the wise giant,
begot a six-headed son."

When Aurgelmir was killed all but two of his children were drowned in his blood, including Þrúðgelmir.
