= Vimur River =

Largest of the Elivagar rivers in Norse mythology

The Vimur is a river in Norse mythology. It is the largest of the Elivagar rivers that were formed at the beginning of the world.

In Skáldskaparmál 18, part of the Norse Edda written by Snorri Sturluson, the Vimur river is mentioned in the tale of Thor and Geirrod. Thor needed to cross the Vimur on his way to Geirrod's abode. The force of the river threatened to sweep Thor away. Geirrod's daughter, Gjalp, tried to drown them by urinating in the river and causing it to rapidly overflow. Thor hurled a rock into the river, effectively stopping the flow. This, together with the help of a rowan tree, allowed Thor to cross the river.
