= Bölþorn =

Norse mythical character

Bölþorn (also Bölþor; Old Norse: Bǫlþorn [ˈbɔlˌθorn], "Evil-thorn") is a jötunn in Norse mythology, and the father (or grandfather depending on the source) of Bestla, the mother of Odin, Vili and Vé by Borr.

The figure receives mention in the Poetic Edda, composed in the 13th century from earlier traditional sources, and the Prose Edda, compiled by Icelander Snorri Sturluson in the 13th century. Scholars have noted that the Poetic Edda mention may mean that he is the father of the wise being Mímir.

== Name ==
The name is attested under two variants. Bölþorn is used in Gylfaginning (The Beguiling of Gylfi), whereas Bölþor occurs in Hávamál (Sayings of the High One).

The Old Norse name Bölþorn has been translated 'Evil-thorn'. The variant form Bölþor would have had no clear meaning to medieval Scandinavians.

== Attestations ==
In Hávamál (Sayings of the High One), Bölþor receives his only mention of the Poetic Edda.

Nine magic songs I got [learned?] from the famous son
Of Bölthor, Bestla’s father,
And I got a drink of the precious mead,
Poured from [by? to?] Ódrerir.

— Hávamál, trans. J. Lindow, 2002.

Gylfaginning (The Beguiling of Gylfi) mentions in the Prose Edda that Bölþorn is a jötunn, and Bestla's father.

He married that woman who was called Bestla, the daughter of the giant Bölthorn. They had three sons; the first was called Odin, the second Vili, the third Vé.

— Snorri Sturluson, Gylfaginning, trans. J. Lindow, 2002.

== Theories ==
It is often argued that the figure of Bölþorn embodies a traditional relationship with the maternal uncle, a pattern found in Germanic myths and legends alike. According to Orchard, the Roman historian Tacitus (1st c. AD) "had already noted the importance of that particular family tie in Germanic society, and there are numerous examples of the closeness of male figures with their maternal uncles in the literary sources." For instance, a medieval Icelandic proverb goes by saying: "Men turn out most like their maternal uncles." Lindow comments : "Certainly Odin, of all the gods, turned out most like a giant."

Various scholars have also noted that the unnamed man (Bölþorn's son and Bestla's brother) in Hávamál may be the wise being Mímir.

== See also ==
- Bölverkr, one of Odin's names
- List of jötnar in Norse mythology
