= Geirröðr =

Norse mythical character

Geirröðr (also Geirröd) is a jötunn in Norse mythology. He is the father of the jötnar Gjálp and Greip, who are killed by the thunder-god Thor, and the possible father of the jötnar Eistla, Angeyja, Ulfrún, Eyrgjafa, Imd, Atla and Járnsaxa.

Geirröðr is mentioned in the skaldic poem Þórsdrápa, written by Eilíf Godrúnarson (late 10th c. AD), itself cited in Skáldskaparmál (early 13th c.) where it is preceded by Snorri Sturluson's account of the myth, and in Gesta Danorum by Saxo Grammaticus (early 13th c.).

Saturn's moon Geirrod is named after him.

== Name ==
The Old Norse name Geirröðr has been translated as 'spear-reddener'. It stems from the Old Norse masculine noun geirr ('spear'), ultimately from the Proto-Germanic *gaizaz ('spear, tip').

An unrelated figure also bears the name Geirröðr in the eddic poem Grímnismál.

== Attestations ==
=== Prose Edda ===
In Skáldskaparmál (The Language of Poetry; early 13th c.), Loki is flying in Frigg’s hawk coat to Geirrödargardar, the abode of the giant Geirröðr, when he is captured by the latter and locked in a chest for three months. To redeem his life, Loki agrees to bring Thor to Geirröðr's place without his belt of strength and hammer. On their way to Geirrödargardar, Thor and Loki (or Thjálfi in Thórsdrápa) stop at the home of the giantess Gríðr. She warns Thor about Geirröðr's plan and equips him with a new belt of strength, a pair of iron gloves, and a staff named Grídarvöl (Gríd’s-staff). Arriving at Geirrödargardar, Thor is eventually challenged to a game by Geirröðr. The giant throws a piece of red-hot iron at him, but Thor is able to catch it with the iron gloves. As Geirröðr tries to hide behind a pillar, Thor throws the piece of iron through the column and kills him.

Then Geirrod had Thor called into the hall for games. There were great fires there along the length of the hall. And when Thor came into the hall opposite Geirrod, Geirrod picked up with tongs a glowing lump of molten iron and threw it at Thor, and with the iron gauntlets Thor caught and raised the molten lump into the air, while Geirrod ran to the shelter of an iron pillar for protection. Thor flung the molten lump and it crashed through the pillar and through Geirrod and through the wall and so into the ground outside.

— Snorri Sturluson, Skáldskaparmál, 18, trans. A. Faulkes, 1987.

=== Viking Age ===
The story is mentioned in Þórsdrápa (late 10th c. AD), cited in the later Skáldskaparmál.

Iord’s son [Thor] began to display unusual knowledge [skill], and the men [giants] of the fiord-apple-[rock-]moor-lair [mountain cave] did not suppress their ale-joy. The bow-string-troubler [warrior, Geirrod], relative of Sudri, struck with forge-heated tongs-morsel [glowing lump of iron] at the mouth of Odin’s sorrow-stealer [helper, Thor].

So that the speedy-hastener of battle [Thor], the old friend of Throng [Freyia], swallowed in the quick bite of his hands the raised drink of molten metal in the air, when the sparkling cinder flew furiously from the grip’s breast [palm] of the passionate desirer [Geirrod] of Hrimnir’s lady to wards the one who longs for Thrud in his heart [Thor].

— Eilífr Goðrúnarson, Þórsdrápa, trans. A. Faulkes, 1987.

=== Other texts ===
In Gesta Danorum (early 13th c.), Thorkillus and his companions notice the pierced body of an old man and three dead women with their backs broken as they visit the vile hall of the dead Geruthus (Geirrøth). Thorkillus tells them that Thor had driven a hot ingot through Geruthus and killed his daughters with thunderbolts.

Advancing, they saw a shattered section of cliff and not far away on a higher platform an old man with a perforated body sitting opposite the area of broken rock ... Since his comrades were curious to know, Thorkil, who was well aware of the reasons behind things, taught them that once the god Thor, harassment by the giants’ insolence, had driven a burning ingot though the vitals of Geirrœth, who was struggling against him...

— Saxo Grammaticus, Gesta Danorum, 8:14:15, trans. P. Fisher, 2015.

In Thorsteins þáttr baejarmagns, Thor's deeds have been reworked and transferred to a hero named Thorstein, involved in a sporting event at the hall of the giant-king Geirröd where a heavy red-hot seal’s head is thrown between the contestants.

== Theories ==
According to scholar John Lindow, the myth of Geirröðr "shows several characteristics of Thor stories—the dangerous journey to the otherworld, the special enmity of female giantesses, and the killing of a male giant—and it also introduces notions of smithing that sometimes seem to lurk behind Thor."
