= Vörnir =

Figure in Nordic mythology

Vörnir is a jötunn in Nordic mythology. He is only extant in Nafnaþulur in the Prose Edda.

The name has been connected to the PIE root *ver- (from *verunyos?), meaning "to cover". Cognates in other Indo-European languages have been suggested, but remain uncertain. The Vedic Varuna, the Mitanni names aruna and urvana, Uranos, the sky god in Greek mythology, the Slavic god Veles, and velnias, the Lithuanian for "devil".
