= Vosud =

Norse mythical character

Vosud or Vásuðr ("Wet and Sleety"), a jötunn from Norse mythology, was the father of Vindsvalr and grandfather of winter (Vetr). He is seen as disagreeable and the personification of the icy wind.
