= Narfi (son of Loki) =

Various names for a Norse god who was a son of Loki<3

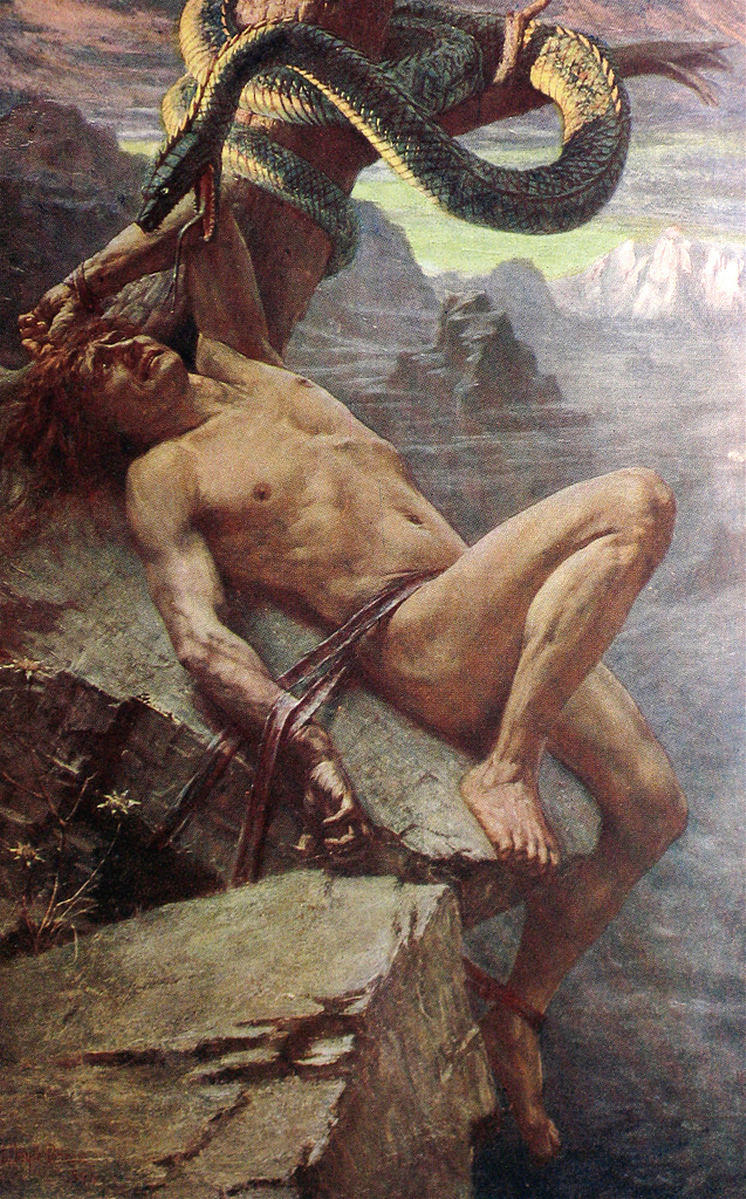
The Punishment of Loki, a painting by James Doyle Penrose, R.H.A. (1862-1932)

In Norse mythology, Narfi (Old Norse: [ˈnɑrve]) is a son of Loki, referred to in a number of sources. According to the Gylfaginning section of Snorri Sturluson's Prose Edda, he was also called Nari and was killed by his brother Váli, who was transformed into a wolf; in a prose passage at the end of the Eddic poem "Lokasenna", Váli became a wolf and his brother Nari was killed.

== Textual mentions ==
In chapter 50 of Gylfaginning, to punish Loki for his crimes, the Æsir turn his son Váli into a wolf and he dismembers his brother, "Nari or Narfi", whose entrails are then used to bind their father.

Nú var Loki tekinn griðalauss ok farit með hann í helli nökkvorn. Þá tóku þeir þrjár hellur ok settu á egg ok lustu rauf á hellunni hverri. Þá váru teknir synir Loka, Váli ok Nari eða Narfi. Brugðu æsir Vála í vargslíki ok reif hann í [sundr] Narfa, bróður sinn. Þá tóku æsir þarma hans ok bundu Loka með yfir þá þrjá [egg]steina, einn undir herðum, annarr undir lendum, þriði undir knésfótum, ok urðu þau bönd at járni.

— Eysteinn Björnsson's edition
Translation:

Now Loki was taken truceless, and was brought with them into a certain cave. Thereupon they took three flat stones, and set them on edge and drilled a hole in each stone. Then were taken Loki's sons, Váli and Nari or Narfi; the Æsir changed Váli into the form of a wolf, and he tore asunder Narfi his brother. And the Æsir took his entrails and bound Loki with them over the three stones: one stands under his shoulders, the second under his loins, the third under his houghs; and those bonds were turned to iron.

— Arthur Gilchrist Brodeur's translation

The prose colophon to "Lokasenna" has a summary of the same story, probably derived from Snorri; In this version, there is no mention of a brother named Váli, Nari is the brother who is killed, Narfi transforms into a wolf, and the connection is not explained. The name Narfi has often been changed to Váli to better conform to the Prose Edda account; for example in Guðni Jónsson's 1954 edition and in Henry Adams Bellows' 1923 English translation.

En eptir þetta falz Loki í Fránangrs forsi í lax líki. Þar tóko æsir hann. Hann var bundinn meþ þǫrmum sonar [síns] Nara. En Narfi sonr hans varð at vargi.

— Codex Regius text as edited by Ursula Dronke
Translation:

After that Loki hid himself in Fránangr's Fall, in the shape of a salmon. The Æsir caught him there. He was tied with the entrails of his own son Nari. But his son Narfi became a wolf.

— Dronke's translation

Snorri also names "Nari or Narfi" as the son of Loki and his wife Sigyn earlier in Gylfaginning, and lists "father of Nari" as a heiti for Loki in the Skáldskaparmál section of his work. In addition, Narfi is mentioned in the much earlier "Ynglingatal" of Þjóðólfr of Hvinir, where Hel is referred to by the kenning jóðís ulfs ok Narfa ("sister of the wolf [i.e. Fenrir] and Narfi"), and in the "Haustlöng", which may be by the same skald.

Narfi also occurs as a personal name. For example, a Norwegian bishop and king's counselor who died in 1304 was named Narve.

== Interpretations ==
The picture is confused, making it uncertain whether Nari and Narfi are the same, and how he or they relate to the father of Nótt, the personification of night, who is also sometimes called Narfi. The name has been interpreted as meaning "narrow", but Rudolf Simek suggests that the association with Hel and the use of the same name for Nótt's father indicate that Narfi may have "originally [been] a demon of the dead" and that his name could be related to the Old Norse word nár, "corpse", which gave rise to Náströnd and Naglfar.

== See also ==
- Narfi
- Váli, a son of Odin
