= Laufey (mythology) =

Old Norse goddess

Laufey or Nál is a figure in Norse mythology and the mother of Loki. The latter is frequently mentioned by the matronymic Loki Laufeyjarson ('son of Laufey') in the Poetic Edda, rather than the expected traditional patronymic Loki Fárbautason ('son of Fárbauti'), in a mythology where kinship is usually reckoned through male ancestry.

== Name ==
The meaning of the Old Norse name Laufey is not clear, but it is generally taken to be related to lauf ('leaves, foliage'), perhaps attached to the suffix -ey (found in female personal names like Bjargey, Þórey), or deriving from a hypothetical tree-goddess named *lauf-awiaz ('the leafy'). (Note: de Vries 1957, p. 263 n. 1 and de Vries 1962, p. 347 also indicate that Hugo Gering interpreted Nál as "killer" and Laufey as "member of a distinguished clan", comparing the name with the Gothic ga-laufs ('valuable, costly') and the Old High German ga-loub ('inspiring trust'). Lindow 2001, p. 208 states that "her name looks as though it should mean 'Leaf-island', but that would be a strange name.")

Since the name of her spouse Fárbauti means "dangerous hitter", a possible natural mythological interpretation has been proposed by some scholars, with lightning hitting the leaves, or needles of a tree to give rise to fire.

== Attestations ==
In Gylfaginning ('The Beguiling of Gylfi'), High introduces Loki as the son of Fárbauti, that "Laufey or Nál" is his mother, and that his brothers are Býleistr and Helblindi. Elsewhere in the same poem, Loki is referred to by the matronymic Laufeyson ('Laufey's son'). This occurs twice more in Gylfaginning and once in Skáldskaparmál.

Skaldskaparmal ('The Language of Poetry') mentions Loki as 'son of Fárbauti' or 'son of Laufey'.

Laufey is listed among Ásynjar (goddesses) in one of the þulur, an ancestry that perhaps led her son Loki to be "enumerated among the Æsir", as Snorri Sturluson puts it in Gylfaginning.

Nál is mentioned twice in the Prose Edda as "Laufey or Nál"; once in Gylfaginning and once in Skáldskaparmál.

In the poem Sörla tháttr, Nál and Laufey are portrayed as the same person: "She was both slender and weak, and for that reason she was called Nál [Needle]." According to scholar John Lindow, however, "the late date of the text makes this piece of information suspect."

== See also ==
- Louhi, the Mistress of the North and the Witch Queen of Pohjola
