= Mögþrasir =

Norse mythical character

In Norse mythology, Mögþrasir (Old Norse: Mǫgþrasir [ˈmɔɣˌθrɑsez̠], possibly meaning "the one who is striving for sons") is a jötunn who is solely attested in stanza 49 of the poem Vafþrúðnismál from the Poetic Edda.

== Vafþrúðnismál ==
Mögþrasir is mentioned during the contest of wisdom between Odin and the giant Vafþrúðnir (here anglicized as Mogthrasir):

Stanza 48:

Odin said:
"Much I have travelled, much have I tried out,
much have I tested the Powers;
who are those maidens who journey in troops,
wise in spirit, over the sea?"

Stanza 49:

Vafthrudnir said:
"Three of the race of Mogthrasir's girls
travel over the settlements,
they are bringers of luck in the world,
although they are raised among giants."

== Theories ==
According to Carolyne Larrington, the identities of these maidens are uncertain but they are probably the Norns. If this is the case, then Mögþrasir is either their father or is being used as a kenning to indicate the Norns' kinship with the jötnar.
