= Váli (son of Loki) =

Figure in Norse mythology, son of Loki

In some versions of Norse mythology, Váli was one of the sons of Loki. He is mentioned in the Gylfaginning section of Snorri Sturluson's Prose Edda, chapter 50, possibly by confusion of a reference to Váli, son of Óðinn as binding Loki.

In the account in Gylfaginning, after the death of Baldr the Æsir chase down and capture Loki:

Nú var Loki tekinn griðalauss ok farit með hann í helli nökkvorn. Þá tóku þeir þrjár hellur ok settu á egg ok lustu rauf á hellunni hverri. Þá váru teknir synir Loka, Váli ok Nari eða Narfi. Brugðu æsir Vála í vargslíki ok reif hann í [sundr] Narfa, bróður sinn. Þá tóku æsir þarma hans ok bundu Loka með yfir þá þrjá [egg]steina, einn undir herðum, annarr undir lendum, þriði undir knésfótum, ok urðu þau bönd at járni.

—Eysteinn Björnsson's edition
Translation:

Now Loki was taken truceless, and was brought with them into a certain cave. Thereupon they took three flat stones, and set them on edge and drilled a hole in each stone. Then were taken Loki's sons, Váli and Nari or Narfi; the Æsir changed Váli into the form of a wolf, and he tore asunder Narfi his brother. And the Æsir took his entrails and bound Loki with them over the three stones: one stands under his shoulders, the second under his loins, the third under his houghs; and those bonds were turned to iron.

—Arthur Gilchrist Brodeur's translation

Váli, son of Loki, is otherwise unknown. A variant version in the Hauksbók manuscript of stanza 34 of "Völuspá" refers to this event; it begins: "Þá kná Vála | vígbǫnd snúa", usually amended to the nominative Váli in order to provide a subject for the verb; in Ursula Dronke's translation in her edition of the poem, "Then did Váli | slaughter bonds twist". This presumably refers to Váli, son of Óðinn, who was begotten to avenge Baldr's death, and thus it is not unlikely that he bound Loki; but the Hauksbók stanza interrupts the flow of "Völuspá" at this point and presumably draws on a variant oral tradition. It is likely that this was Snorri's source, and that he interpreted the manuscript text Vála vígbǫnd as "bonds from Váli's act of slaughter", thus inventing a second Váli. In the rather cryptic prose at the end of "Lokasenna", which appears to be derived from Snorri's account, Narfi transforms into a wolf and his brother Nari's guts are used to bind their father.
