= Heimdalargaldr =

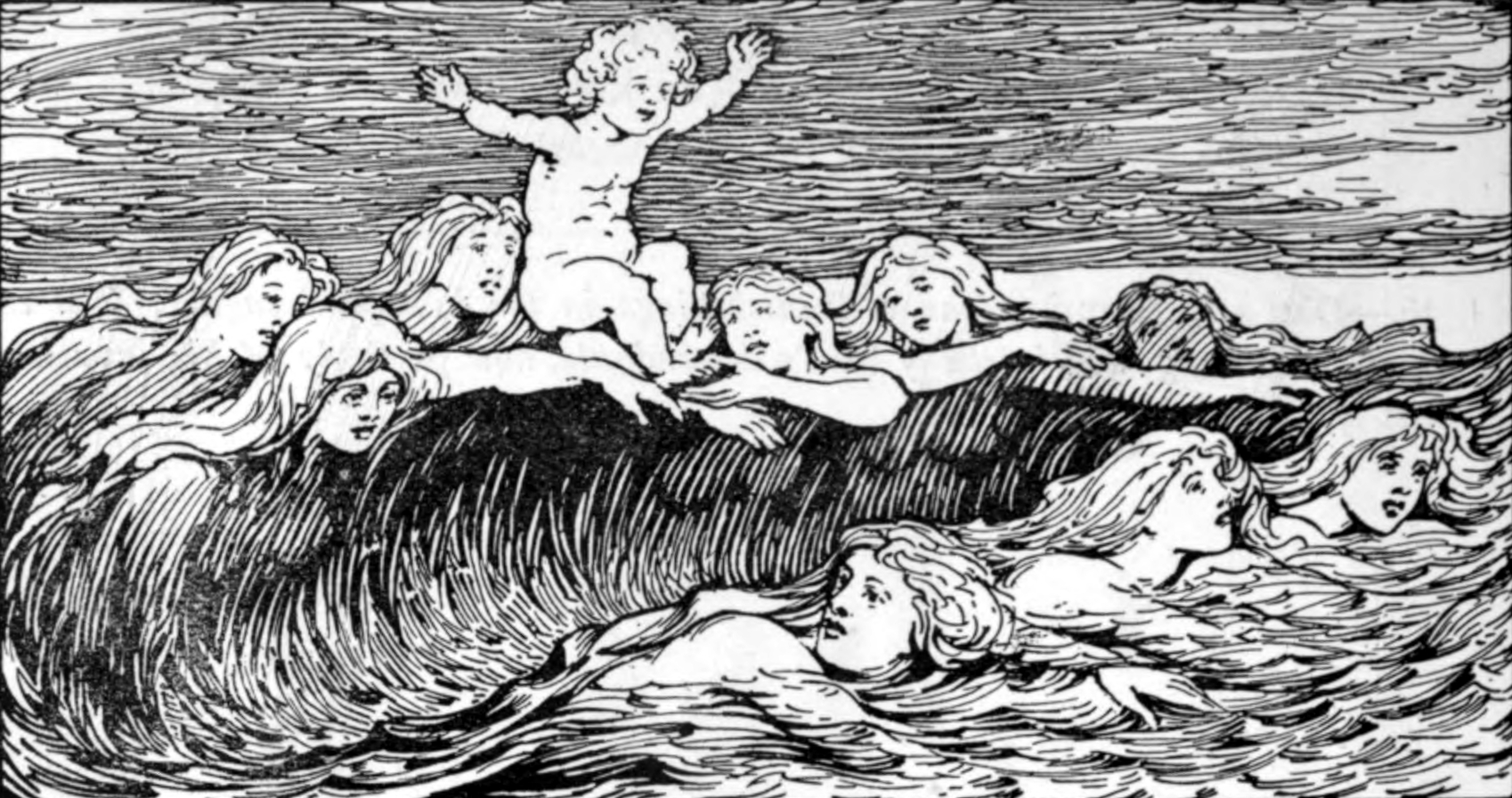
Heimdal and his Nine Mothers, an illustration

Heimdalargaldr (Old Norse: 'Heimdallr's Galdr') is an Old Norse poem about the god Heimdallr of Norse mythology. The poem is mentioned in two books of the 13th century Prose Edda book—Gylfaginning and Skáldskaparmál—but outside of a single, two-lined fragment that appears in Gylfaginning, the poem is considered to be lost. In the surviving fragment, Heimdallr comments that he is the son of nine sisters (the Nine Mothers of Heimdallr).

== Fragment ==
The poem is mentioned in two books of the Prose Edda; Gylfaginning and Skáldskaparmál. The sole surviving fragment of Heimdalargaldr appears in chapter 25 of Gylfaginning. In the chapter, the enthroned figure of High tells the disguised mythical king Gangleri about the god Heimdallr, including that he is the son of nine sisters. After quoting a stanza about the Heimdallr's dwelling Himinbjörg from the poem Grímnismál, High comments that Heimdallr says the following lines in a work by the name of Heimdalargaldr:

Arthur Gilchrist Brodeur's translation:

I am of nine mothers the offspring,
Of sisters nine am I the son.

Anthony Faulkes's translation:

"Offspring of nine mothers am I,
Of nine sisters am I the son."

In chapter 8 of Skáldskaparmál, various ways to refer to Heimdallr are provided. The section notes that Heimdallr is the subject of a work known as Heimdalargaldr, and that, since the poem, "the head has been called Heimdall's doom: man's doom is an expression for sword."

== Commentary ==
Scholar John Lindow comments that the Heimdalargaldr must have provided information about the deeds and feats of Heimdallr, and that having the poem preserved would have helped with the difficulties that what survives about it presents, such as Heimdallr's birth by way of nine sisters and why a head would be known as "Heimdallr's sword".
