= Býleistr =

Norse mythical character

Býleistr (Old Norse: [ˈbyːlˌɛistz̠]; also Byleist) is the brother of Loki in Norse mythology.

== Name ==
The meaning of the Old Norse name Býleistr is uncertain. The most popular propositions are compounds formed with the word bylr ('storm'), either as byl-leystr ('storm-relieving'), byl-leiptr ('storm-flasher'), or byl-heistr ('violent storm').

Various forms are attested in the manuscripts of the Prose Edda: 'Býleistr' (Codices Regius and Wormianus), 'Blýleistr' (Codex Trajectinus), or 'Býleiptr' (Codex Upsaliensis).

== Attestations ==
Although there is no action involving Býleistr in the original sources, Loki is frequently called by the kenning 'Byleist's brother' (bróðir Býleists), such as in Völuspá (51), Hyndluljóð (40), or Skáldskaparmál (16).

In both Gylfaginning (34) and Skáldskaparmál, Snorri Sturluson explicitly states that Byleist is, along with Helblindi, one of Loki's two brothers.

Based on this relation, a number of scholars have considered Býleistr to be a son of Fárbauti and his consort Laufey. However, his exact role in the ancient mythic complex surrounding Loki's family remains unclear.
