= Sumarr and Vetr =

Norse seasons of summer and winter personified

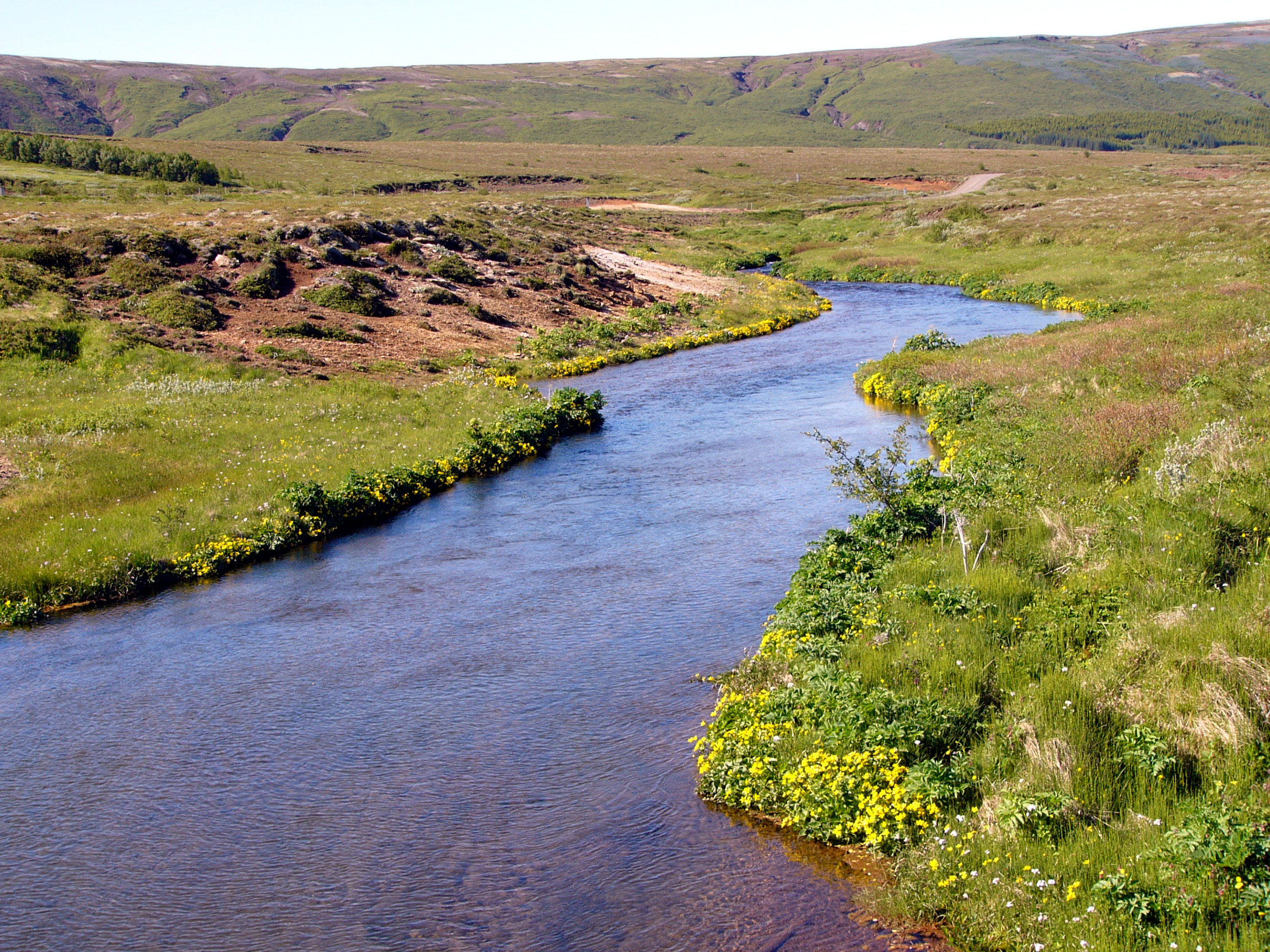
Summer near Geysir, Iceland.

Sumarr ('summer') and vetr ('winter') are the two divisions of the year in the Old Norse calendar. Vetr is also the term for counting years. In Norse mythology, Sumarr and Vetr occur as personified figures with named fathers in both the Poetic Edda, compiled in the 13th century from earlier traditional sources, and the Prose Edda, composed or compiled in the 13th century by Snorri Sturluson. The Prose Edda additionally names Vetr's grandfather and cites skaldic kennings in which both Sumarr and Vetr are personified.

== Etymology ==
The Old Icelandic nouns sumarr (also neuter sumar) and vetr derive from Proto-Germanic, and their cognates are found throughout other Germanic languages, including contemporary English summer and winter. The Proto-Germanic words are reconstructed as *sumeraz and *wentruz.

== Seasons ==
The Old Norse year was divided into two halves, winter and summer, referred to as misseri. The four-fold division of the year into seasons was introduced from the Julian calendar, but the two-fold division remained important in people's minds. In addition, vetr (literally, 'winter') was the word normally used in counting years, for example in stating ages; ár, the word cognate with English "year", was primarily used in the specialized meaning "good harvest", as in the fixed phrase til árs ok friðar, "for peace and plenty".

== Personifications ==
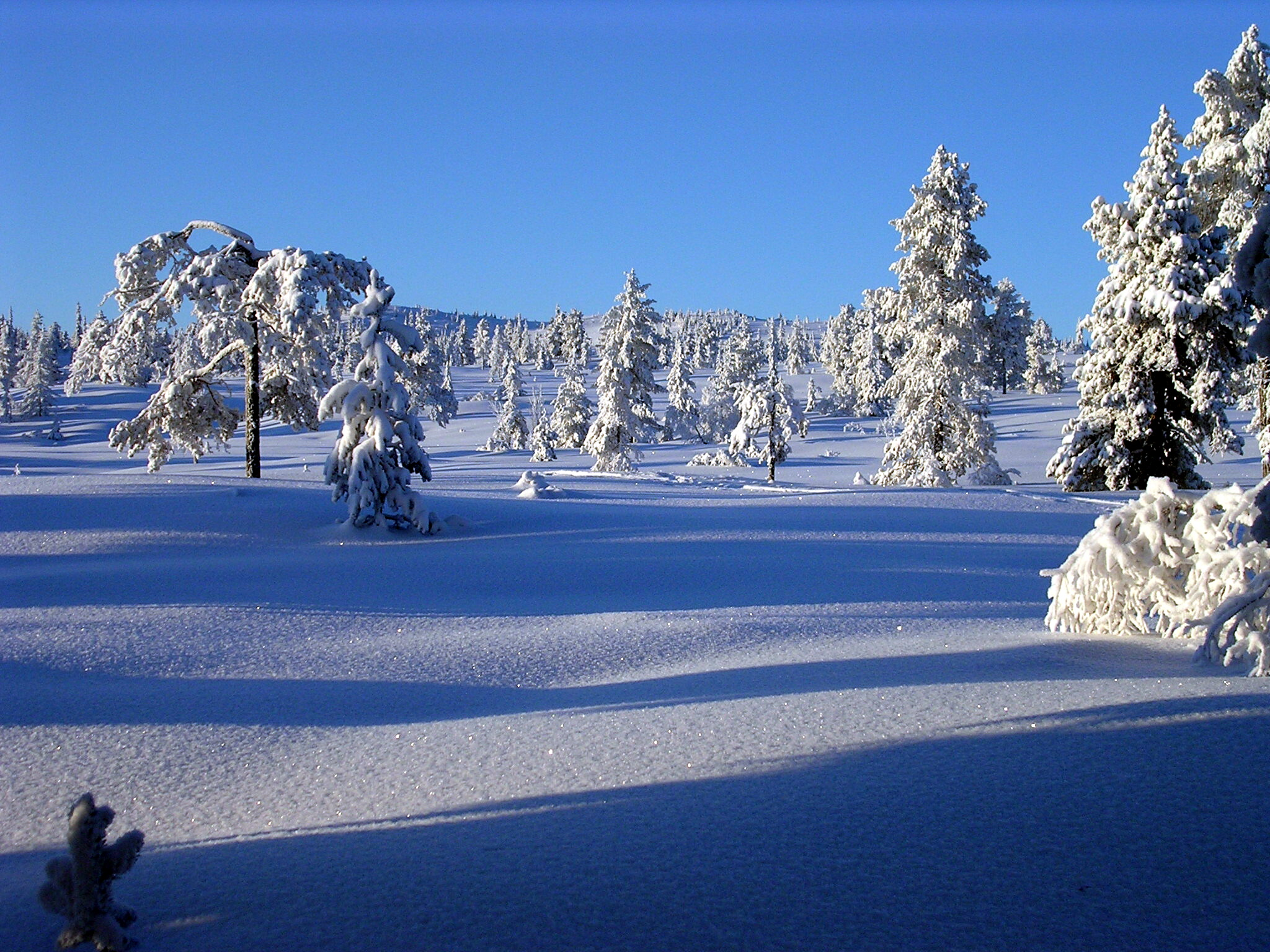
Winter in Blefjell, Norway

=== Attestations ===
In stanza 26 of the Poetic Edda poem Vafþrúðnismál, the god Odin (disguised as "Gagnráðr") asks the jötunn Vafþrúðnir where Vetr and "warm Sumar" originally came from when they arrived "among the wise Powers" (regin; the gods). In stanza 27, Vafþrúðnir responds:

Wind-cool [Vindsvalr] he is called, Winter's [Vetr's] father,
and Mild-One [Svásuðr], the father of Summer [Sumar(r)].

The second half of this stanza is missing from early manuscripts, but some later manuscripts feature the addition of:

And both of these shall ever be
Till the gods to destruction go.

In chapter 19 of the Prose Edda book Gylfaginning, Gangleri (King Gylfi in disguise) asks why there is an evident difference between summer and winter. The enthroned figure of High responds, and (after scolding him for asking a question everyone knows the answer to) states that the father of Sumarr is Svásuðr, who is quite pleasant, while the father of Vetr is known as Vindsvalr or, alternately, Vindljóni, son of Vásaðr, and Vetr has inherited his disposition from these "cruel and cold-hearted kinsmen".

The Prose Edda book Skáldskaparmál lists winter and summer (sumar), followed by spring and autumn as a second pair, as words for "times" in chapter 63. In addition, Skáldskaparmál cites kennings referring to summer and winter, some of which personify them. Kennings for "summer" listed in chapter 30 are "son of Svásuðr", "comfort of the snakes", and "growth of men". The illustrative example excerpted from a poem by the skald Egill Skallagrímsson refers to summer as "valley-fish's [snake's] mercy". In chapter 26, "Son of Vindsvalr", "snake's death", and "storm season" are listed as kennings for "winter". The examples given are "snake woe" in a verse by the 12th-century skald Ásgrímr Ketilsson, his only preserved work, and the personified "Vindsvalr's son" in a verse by Ormr Steinþórsson, who may also have lived and worked in the 12th century.

=== Scholarly reception ===
The 19th-century German philologist and folklorist Jacob Grimm interpreted the personified Sumar (Grimm was aware only of the neuter usages) and Vetr as jötuns, Sumar and his father "of a good friendly sort" and Vetr and his line "of a malignant [sort]", displaying "the twofold nature" of the jötuns. He highlights that both "winter" and "summer" appear as Germanic name elements (such as in Wintarolf, meaning 'Winter-wolf'). Discussing a variety of other personifications of summer and winter in the Germanic textual corpus, he relates the personified figures to the personified day and night in Norse mythology, Dagr and Nótt, and refers to a topos in folk tradition of the two seasons being "at war with one another, exactly like Day and Night". In the 21st century, Paul S. Langeslag similarly regarded Sumarr and Vetr as figures in conflict, but as divinities rather than giants: "gods that govern seasonally", with the genealogies providing "a divine aetiology" for the difference between the seasons.

Austrian philologist Rudolf Simek regarded both personifications as late "purely literary" inventions since they do not occur in any recorded myths, suggesting that they may have been "adopted from ... riddle poetry".
