= Hjálmþés saga ok Ölvis =

Hjálmþés saga ok Ölvis is a late legendary saga without an apparent historic basis. It is about two children of a jarl, and one of them is Hjálmþér whose evil stepmother commands him to work as a thrall until he has performed an impossible task.

In its present form, it stacks different motifs on top of each other. However, according to Icelandic philologist Finnur Jónsson the various Hjálmþésrímur which appear in the saga reveal that it once had a different structure.

There are many folk tales similar to Hjálmþés saga ok Ölvis, including a number of medieval Irish stories, the Northumbrian tale The Laidly Worm of Spindleston Heugh (also known as The Laidly Worm of Bamburgh (or Bamborough).

== Sources ==
- Ohlmarks, Åke. (1982). Fornnordiskt lexikon. Tiden. ISBN 91-550-2511-0
