= Helblindi =

Norse mythical character

Helblindi (Old Norse: [ˈhelˌblinde], 'Helblind') is a jötunn in Norse mythology. According to 13th-century poet Snorri Sturluson, he is the brother of Loki and Býleistr.

== Name ==
The Old Norse name Helblindi has been translated as 'Helblind'.

Helblindi is also one of the many names of the god Odin, as found in Grímnismál (The Lay of Grímnir) or Gylfaginning (The Beguiling of Gylfi).

...he [Odin] called himself by various other names on his visit to King Geirrod:

I call myself Grim and Ganglari, Herian, ... Helblindi,...

— Gylfaginning, 19–20, transl. A. Faulkes, 1987.

== Attestations ==
In the Prose Edda, Helblindi is several times noted as the brother of Loki and, implicitly, as the son of Laufey and Fárbauti.

His name is Loki or Lopt, son of the giant Farbauti. Laufey or Nal is his mother. Byleist and Helblindi are his brothers.

— Gylfaginning, 27–34, trans. A. Faulkes, 1987.

How shall Loki be referred to? By calling him son of Farbauti and Laufey, of Nal, brother of Byleist and Helblindi...

— Skáldskaparmál, 8–16, trans. A. Faulkes, 1987.

== Theories ==
Although it is not directly attested in original sources, scholars have considered Helblindi to be a son of Fárbauti. His exact role in the ancient mythic complex surrounding Loki's family remains unclear, however.
