= Borr =

Norse mythical character

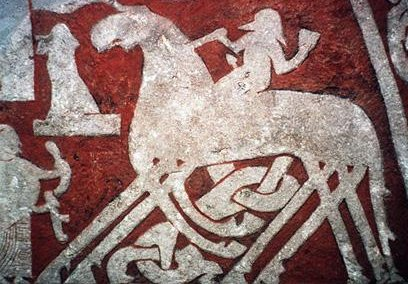

In Norse mythology, Borr, Börr or Burr (Note: The Konungsbók or Codex Regius MS of the Völuspá reads Búrr; the Hauksbók MS reads Borr; cf. Nordal (1980), p. 31. The latter form alone was used by 13th century historian and poet Snorri Sturluson; cf. Simek (1988), p. 54.) (Old Norse: 'borer' sometimes anglicized Bor, Bör or Bur) was the son of Búri. Borr was the husband of Bestla and the father of Odin, Vili and Vé. Borr receives mention in a poem in the Poetic Edda, compiled in the 13th century from earlier traditional material, and in the Prose Edda, composed in the 13th century by Icelander Snorri Sturluson. Scholars have proposed a variety of theories about the figure.

== Attestation ==
Borr is mentioned in the fourth verse of the Völuspá, a poem contained in the Poetic Edda, and in the sixth chapter of Gylfaginning, the second section of the Prose Edda.

=== Völuspá ===
Original text: Áðr Burs synir bjóðum umb ypðu, þeir er Miðgarð mæran skópu.	Bellow's translation: Then Bur's sons lifted the level land, Mithgarth the mighty there they made.

=== Gylfaginning ===
Original text: Hann [Búri] gat son þann er Borr hét, hann fekk þeirar konu er Bes[t]la hét, dóttir Bölþorns iötuns, ok fengu þau .iii. [þrjá] sonu, hét einn Óðinn, annarr Vili, .iii. [þriði] Vé.	Brodeur's translation: [Búri] begat a son called Borr, who wedded the woman named Bestla, daughter of Bölthorn the giant; and they had three sons: one was Odin, the second Vili, the third Vé.

Borr is not mentioned again in the Prose Edda. In skaldic and eddaic poetry, Odin is occasionally referred to as Borr's son.

== Scholarly reception and interpretation ==
The role of Borr in Norse mythology is unclear. Nineteenth-century German scholar Jacob Grimm proposed to equate Borr with Mannus as related in Tacitus' Germania on the basis of the similarity in their functions in Germanic theogeny. (Note: "Must not Buri, Börr, Oðinn be parallel, though under other names, to Tvisco, Mannus, Inguio? Inguio has two brothers at his side, Iscio and Hermino, as Oðinn has Vili and Ve; we should then see the reason why the names Týski (Tvisco, i.e. Tuisto) and Maðr (Mannus) are absent from the Edda, because Buri and Börr are their substitutes." Grimm (1883), p. 349)

The 19th century Icelandic scholar and archaeologist Finnur Magnússon hypothesized that Borr was

"intended to signify [...] the first mountain or mountain-chain, which it was deemed by the forefathers of our race had emerged from the waters in the same region where the first land made its appearance. This mountain chain is probably the Caucasus, called by the Persians Borz (the genitive of the Old Norse Borr). Bör's wife, Belsta or Bestla, a daughter of the giant Bölthorn (spina calamitosa), is possibly the mass of ice formed on the alpine summits."

In his Lexicon Mythologicum, published four years later, he modified his theory to claim that Borr symbolized the earth, and Bestla the ocean, which gave birth to Odin as the "world spirit" or "great soul of the earth" (spiritus mundi nostri; terrae magna anima, aëris et aurae numen), Vili or Hoenir as the "heavenly light" (lux, imprimis coelestis) and Vé or Lódur as "fire" (ignis, vel elementalis vel proprie sic dictus).

Highlighting that no source provides information about Borr's mother (Borr's father was licked free from the earth by the primeval cow Auðumbla), Rudolf Simek observes that "It is not clear how Burr came to be".
