= Járnsaxa =

Norse jötunn (giantess)

Járnsaxa (/jɑːrnˈsæksə/; Old Norse: [ˈjɑːrnˌsɑksɑ]) is a jötunn in Norse mythology. In the Prose Edda of Snorri Sturluson, she is described as the lover of Thor and the mother of his son Magni.

== Name ==
Old Norse sax corresponds to Old English seax and refers to a short sword or large knife; járn means 'iron'. Járnsaxa has been translated as 'iron dagger', 'the one with the iron knife' or 'armed with an iron sword'.

== Attestations ==
In Völuspá hin skamma, Járnsaxa is named as one of the Nine Mothers of Heimdallr.

In Skáldskaparmál, elja Járnsǫxu, 'the rival of Járnsaxa' or 'one who shares a man with Járnsaxa', is listed as one of the ways of referring to Thor's wife, the goddess Sif, who is there also called the mother of Thor's daughter, Þrúðr. In the story of Thor's duel with Hrungnir, Snorri refers to Magni as the son of Thor and Járnsaxa, and at the end of the story Odin says that Thor did wrong to offer the giant's splendid horse Gullfaxi to Magni, the son of a giantess, rather than to himself, Thor's father. Whether Járnsaxa is also the mother of Thor's other son, Móði, is nowhere mentioned.
