= Bestla =

Norse mythical character

Bestla (Old Norse: [ˈbestlɑ]) is a jötunn in Norse mythology, and the mother of Odin, Vili and Vé by Borr. She is the sister of an unnamed man who assisted Odin, and the daughter (or granddaughter depending on the source) of the jötunn Bölþorn. Odin is frequently called "Bestla's son" in both skaldic verses and the Poetic Edda.

Bestla is attested in the Poetic Edda, compiled in the 13th century from earlier traditional sources, the Prose Edda, written in the 13th century by Snorri Sturluson, and in the poetry of skalds. Scholars have commented on the obscurity of the figure's name and have proposed various theories to explain the role and origin of the giantess.

== Name ==
The meaning of the Old Norse name Bestla remains uncertain. Scholars have proposed potential meanings such as 'wife', or 'bark, bast'. It might stem from *Bastilōn (perhaps a yew goddess, originally a 'bast-donor'), or from *Banstillōn (via an intermediate form *Böstla), related to Old Frisian bös ('marriage, union', originally 'wife').

According to Rudolf Simek, "the name appears to be very old" due to its obscurity.

== Attestations ==
In Gylfaginning (The Beguiling of Gylfi), she is portrayed as the daughter of the giant Bölþorn and as the spouse of Borr, while the enthroned figure of Hárr (High) tells Gangleri (described as king Gylfi in disguise) of the genealogy of the god Odin.

He married that woman who was called Bestla, the daughter of the giant Bölthorn. They had three sons; the first was called Odin, the second Vili, the third Vé.

— Snorri Sturluson, Gylfaginning, 5–7, trans. J. Lindow, 2002.

In Skáldskaparmál (The Language of Poetry), a poem by the skald Einarr Helgarson refers to Odin as "Bestla's son".

Hávamál (140) makes Bölþor(n) the grandfather of Bestla. Odin recounts his gaining of nine magical songs from Bestla's unnamed brother. If nothing indicates a family relationship between Odin and the man in the stanza (although skalds were certainly aware of Bestla as Odin's mother), and if the mead was allegedly stolen according to other sources, it is possible that Odin obtained magical songs from his maternal uncle.

B. Thorpe translation (1866): Potent songs nine from the famed son I learned of Bolthorn, Bestla’s sire, and a draught obtained of the precious mead, drawn from Odhrærir.	H. A. Bellows translation (1923): Nine mighty songs I got from the son Of Bolthorn, Bestla's father; And a drink I got of the goodly mead Poured out from Othrorir.	J. Lindow translation (2002): Nine magic songs I got [learned?] from the famous son Of Bölthor, Bestla’s father, And I got a drink of the precious mead, Poured from [by? to?] Ódrerir.

== Theories ==
On the basis of the Hávamál stanza handled above (wherein Odin learns nine magic songs from the unnamed brother of Bestla), some scholars have theorized that Bestla's brother may in fact be the wise being Mímir, from whose severed head the god Odin gains wisdom.

Since Odin is descended from the jötnar on his mother's side, the slaying of Ymir by him and his brothers could be seen as an intra-familial killing and, according to scholar John Lindow, "the slaying or denial of a maternal relation".

Waltraud Hunke has argued that Bestla should be regarded as the bark of the world tree on which Odin was perhaps born, alluding to Hávamál (141): "then I started to grow fruitful".

In his translation of the Poetic Edda, Henry Adams Bellows comments that such the position of the stanza 140 in Hávamál appears to be the result of manuscript interpolation, and that its meaning is obscure.
