= Fárbauti =

Norse mythological character

Fárbauti (Old Norse) is a jötunn in Norse mythology. In all sources, he is portrayed as the father of Loki. Fárbauti is attested in the Prose Edda and in kennings of Viking Age skalds.

== Name ==
The Old Norse name Fárbauti has been translated as 'dangerous striker', 'anger striker', or 'sudden-striker'. It is a compound formed with the noun fár ('hostility, danger, unfortunateness, falseness') attached to the verb bauta ('to strike').

The name also appear as a kenning for "arrow" or "bow" in some Icelandic Rune poems for ᛦ (Aur → Ýr 'bow', or Ǫr 'arrow'), where the prefix stems from fara ("to fare, travel") and far ("far, at distance"), giving the sense 'faring striker', either denoting a projectile (arrow), or a projector (bow).

== Attestations ==
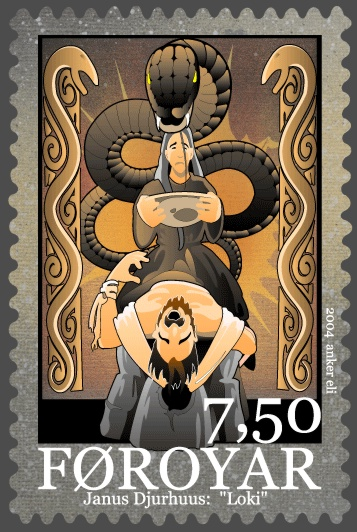
Punishment of Loki, who is depicted with his wife Sigyn, as shown on a stamp from the Faroe Islands

Two 10th-century skalds call Loki "son of Fárbauti", using, however, the poetic word mögr for 'son' rather than the usual sonr.

The skald Úlfr Uggason is quoted referring to Loki as "Fárbauti's terribly sly son", and the skald Þjóðólfr of Hvinir mentions Loki as "Fárbauti's son".

Renowned defender [Heimdall] of the powers’ way [Bifröst], kind of counsel, competes with Farbauti’s terribly sly son [Loki] at Singastein

— Úlfr Uggason, Skáld. 16–17, trans. A. Faulkes, 1987.

The gracious lord of earth [Odin] bade Farbauti’s son [Loki] quickly share the bow-string-Var’s [Skadi’s] whale [ox] among the fellows.

— Þjóðólfr of Hvinir, Skáld. 22, trans. A. Faulkes, 1987.

In Gylfaginning ('The Beguiling of Gylfi'), the enthroned figure of High states that Loki is the son of the jötunn Fárbauti, and that "Laufey or Nál is his mother".

His name is Loki or Lopt, son of the giant Farbauti. Laufey or Nal is his mother. Byleist and Helblindi are his brothers.

— Gylfaginning, 27–34, trans. A. Faulkes, 1987.

In Skáldskaparmál ('The Language of Poetry'), Fárbauti is mentioned among kennings referring to his son Loki.

How shall Loki be referred to? By calling him son of Farbauti and Laufey, of Nal, brother of Byleist and Helblindi...

— Skáldskaparmál, 8–16, trans. A. Faulkes, 1987.

== Theories ==
Axel Kock has proposed Fárbauti's name and character may have been inspired by the observation of the natural phenomena surrounding the appearance of wildfire. If Fárbauti as "dangerous striker" refers to "lightning", the figure would appear to be part of an early nature myth alluding to wildfire (Loki) being produced by lightning (Fárbauti) striking dry tinder such as leaves (Laufey) or pine needles (Nál).

Although only indirectly attested in a kenning of Völuspá ('Prophecy of the Völva') mentioning Loki as "Byleist’s brother", some scholars have considered Loki's brothers Helblindi and Býleistr to also be sons of Fárbauti. However, their exact role in the presumably ancient mythic complex surrounding Loki's family remains largely unclear.
