= Eilífr Goðrúnarson =

Icelandic poet

Eilífr Goðrúnarson (Old Norse: [ˈɛiˌliːvz̠ ˈɡoðˌruːnɑz̠ˌson]; Modern Icelandic: Eilífur Goðrúnarson [ˈeiːˌliːvʏr ˈkɔðˌruːnarˌsɔːn]) was a late 10th-century skald, considered to be the author of the poem Þórsdrápa. He is also credited with Hákonar drápa jarls and a fragment remains of a poem with Christian allusions which is also believed to be his work. He was a court poet of Hákon the Powerful.
