= Hymiskviða =

12th Century Poem

Thor's foot goes through the boat as he struggles to pull up Jörmungandr in the Altuna Runestone.

Hymiskviða (Old Norse: 'The lay of Hymir'; anglicized as Hymiskvitha, Hymiskvidha or Hymiskvida) is a poem collected in the Poetic Edda. The poem was first written down in the late 13th century.

== Summary ==
The Æsir consult their augury twigs and decide, since Ægir owns a lot of kettles for making beer, that he should be their host frequently. Ægir has to reluctantly agree, but as this will be a lot of work, he makes a condition (that he hopes they won't be able to meet) that they bring a kettle large enough for him to make beer for all of them at once. That presents a problem, until Týr remembers a particularly large kettle in the possession of his father Hymir. So the Æsir set off. Eventually they find Hymir's place, where Þórr (Thor) eats so much that Hymir and his guests have no alternative but to go fishing. The poem then tells the story of how Þórr almost caught the Jörmungandr, which is also recounted in the Prose Edda. Þórr shows off his strength, but Hymir taunts him and says that he could hardly be called strong if Þórr couldn't break Hymir's chalice. The chalice was a magic one and could not be broken unless slung against Hymir's head. Þórr is eventually told so and proceeds to do it. Hymir is annoyed but says that they can take the kettle and leave. There follows the slaying of hordes of jötnar, whereupon the Æsir leave with the kettle and booze contentedly at Ægir's place ever after (or at least until Lokasenna).

The poem contains fragments of a number of myths, and it shows. There is little structure to it, and scenes follow each other in a very rough logical order. Some of the allusions are not known from other sources and it contains unusually many kennings for an Eddic poem.

== Comparative mythology ==
Similarities between the Hymiskviða and the Indian Samudra manthan have been pointed out by Georges Dumézil and others; see Samudra manthan § Comparative mythology.
