= Þórsdrápa =

Skaldic poem by Eilífr Goðrúnarson

Þórsdrápa (also Thorsdrapa; Old Norse: 'The Lay of Thor') is a skaldic poem by Eilífr Goðrúnarson, a poet in the service of Jarl Hákon Sigurðarson. The poem is noted for its creative use of kennings and other metaphorical devices, as well as its labyrinthine complexity.

== Narrative synopsis ==
The principal subject of the poem is a narrative relating as to how Thor came by his hammer, Mjolnir (Mjǫlnir), and, as is usually the case in stories with Thor, how the giants came off worse. Behind it all, of course, is Loki, who gulls Thor into a confrontation with the giant Geirrod (Geirrǫðr). With the aid of some magical gifts from the giantess Grid (Gríðr), Thor, accompanied by Þjálfi, defeats Geirrod and kills a number of other giants.

The narrative begins with an account of the trickery of Loki in inciting Thor to make war again against the giants; Þjálfi joins up with Thor but Loki is altogether more reluctant to the point of not going. The narrative then details Thor's (highly metaphorical) crossing of the oceans to Jötunheimr, with Þjálfi hanging onto his waist band. Being a drapa (drápa) the poem is rich in praise of Thor and Þjálfi's valour in making the difficult crossing.

They are immediately set upon by a gang of giants from the cave of Geirrod, but Thor and Thjalfi (Þjálfi) quickly put them to flight (although in Snorri's version of the tale Þjálfi is replaced with Loki). Thor is then brought into Geirrod's house whereupon the seat he is sitting in is raised to the ceiling crushing him, however he strikes the ceiling with the stick given to him by Grid and he descends crushing two giantesses, daughters of Geirrod, beneath him.

Geirrod then invites Thor to play a game, and throws a lump of molten iron at him which he (Thor) catches in his iron gloves. Geirrod hides behind a pillar and then Thor throws the iron through the pillar and giant.

== Analogues ==
The myth related in the poem is also preserved in prose form by Snorri Sturluson in the Skáldskaparmál and a looser analogue is found in Saxo Grammaticus' Gesta Danorum. There are a number of discrepancies between Snorri's and Eilífr's versions of the myth; for example Þjálfi is not present in the story in Snorri's Edda while he has a prominent role in Þórsdrápa.

== Other Þórsdrápur ==
Two (fragments of) poems are sometimes referred to as Þórsdrápa:

- three half-stanzas written by Eysteinn Valdason in the 10th century relating Thor's fishing expedition to kill Jörmungandr;
- one stanza and two verses composed by Þorbjörn dísarskáld in the 10th or 11th century, the stanza consisting of a list of giants and giantesses killed by Thor.

Both were preserved only in the Skáldskaparmál (4).
