= Arthur Gilchrist Brodeur =

Arthur Gilchrist Brodeur (September 18, 1888 – September 9, 1971) was a scholar of early English, German, and Old Norse literature at the University of California, Berkeley. He is known primarily for his scholarly work on Beowulf and his translation of Snorri Sturluson's Prose Edda for The American-Scandinavian Foundation, but also as a writer of pulp fiction and for his left-wing politics.

== Early life and education ==
Brodeur was born in Franklin, Massachusetts, to Clarence Arthur Brodeur, a private school teacher who served as Superintendent of Schools at Warren and Chicopee, and to Mary Cornelia (née Latta). He earned Bachelor's, Master's, and Doctoral degrees at Harvard University in 1909, 1911, and 1916, with a dissertation on the topos of the grateful lion in medieval literature.

== Career and writings ==
While a student, Brodeur taught German and history in a boys' school and was a visiting lecturer at the University of Oregon. However, the bulk of his career was spent at the University of California, Berkeley, where he started in 1916 as an instructor in English and Germanic philology, became a full professor in 1930, and remained until retiring in 1955. He was chairman of the special committee on professionalizing the University of California Press in 1932. After retiring from the University of California, he returned to the University of Oregon. In 1959, he published The Art of Beowulf, which has been called "one of the books that any student of the poem must read."

Brodeur was active in the establishment of the Department of Scandinavian Studies at the University of California, and served as its first chairman from 1946 until 1951. He had already been translating Old Norse for the American-Scandinavian Society before completing his doctorate. His translation of the Prose Edda by Snorri Sturluson appeared the same year as he was awarded the degree. In 1944, he was declared a Knight 1st Class of the Royal Order of Vasa for his services to Scandinavian studies.

In connection with his interest in ballads, Brodeur was active in folklore studies.

Early in his career, Brodeur wrote and co-wrote fiction for the popular magazines Argosy and Adventure. Many stories focused on topics of Northern history and legend, such as Harald Hardrada's time in the Varangian Guard (the serialized novel He Rules Who Can, 1928) and Völsunga saga (the novella "Vengeance," 1925). Brodeur also wrote a series about the exploits of two knights, Faidit and Cercamon, in twelfth-century France. With Farnham Bishop, Brodeur wrote adventure stories starring Lady Fulvia, a Sicilian warrior woman in the time of King Roger II, as well as the novel The Altar of the Legion (1926).

Brodeur was also known for his progressive politics. He was on the committee organizing fund-raising for Arthur J. Kraus' appeal against his dismissal by the City College of New York. Gordon Griffiths wrote in his memoir that Brodeur, J. Robert Oppenheimer, and Haakon Chevalier were the sole members of the Berkeley Communist faculty group in the early 1940s. Brodeur was one of the University of California faculty who refused to sign the loyalty oath as required by the Regents of the University in 1949 (see Levering Act), although he ultimately did decide to sign and continue the fight from within.

== Selected works ==
- Sturlusson, Snorri (1916) [13th century]. The Prose Edda . Scandinavian Classics 5. Translated by Brodeur, Arthur Gilchrist. The American-Scandinavian Foundation. OCLC 974934 – via Wikisource.
- The Altar of the Legion (with Farnham Bishop). Boston, Little, Brown, and Company, 1926. (reprinted from Adventure magazine)
- Arthur, Dux Bellorum. University of California publications in English, volume 3, no. 7. Berkeley: University of California, 1939. OCLC 420324
- The Art of Beowulf. Berkeley: University of California, 1959. OCLC 248278
- Brodeur, Arthur Gilchrist & Brady, Caroline (November 1940). "Sundrmœðri—Sammœðra". Scandinavian Studies and Notes. XVI (4). Society for the Advancement of Scandinavian Study: 133–137. JSTOR 40908177.
- In the Grip of the Minotaur (with Farnham Bishop). Normal, IL, Black Dog Books, 2010. (reprinted from Adventure magazine)
- The Adventures of Faidit and Cercamon. Boston, MA, Altus Press, 2014. (reprinted from Adventure magazine)
- He Rules Who Can. Boston, MA, Steeger Books, 2021. (reprinted from Argosy magazine)
