= Völuspá hin skamma =

Old Norse poem

Völuspá hin skamma (Old Norse: 'The Short Völuspá) is an Old Norse poem which survives as a handful of stanzas in Hyndluljóð, in the Poetic Edda, and as one stanza in the Gylfaginning section of Snorri Sturluson's Prose Edda. The name of the poem is only known due to Snorri's citation of it in Gylfaginning (chapter 5):

[...] ok var sá nefndr Ymir, en hrímþursar kalla hann Aurgelmi, ok eru þaðan komnar ættir hrímþursa, svá sem segir í Völuspá inni skömmu: 7. Eru völur allar frá Viðolfi, vitkar allir frá Vilmeiði, en seiðberendr frá Svarthöfða, jötnar allir frá Ymi komnir.	And that man is named Ymir, but the Rime-Giants call him Aurgelimir; and thence are come the races of the Rime-Giants, as it says in Völuspá the Less: - All the witches spring from Witolf, All the warlocks are of Willharm, And the spell-bearers spring from Swarthead; All the ogres of Ymir come.

The additional stanzas that remain appear in Hyndluljóð. In his translation of Hyndluljóð, Henry Adams Bellows comments that the preserved fragment of Völuspá hin skamma shows that it was a "late and very inferior imitation of the great Voluspo", and he dates it to the twelfth century. He further suggests that its appearance in Hyndluljóð is due to the blunder of a copyist who confused the two poems, and he does not consider them to be of any great value either as poetry or as mythology.
