= Vafþrúðnismál =

Eddic poem

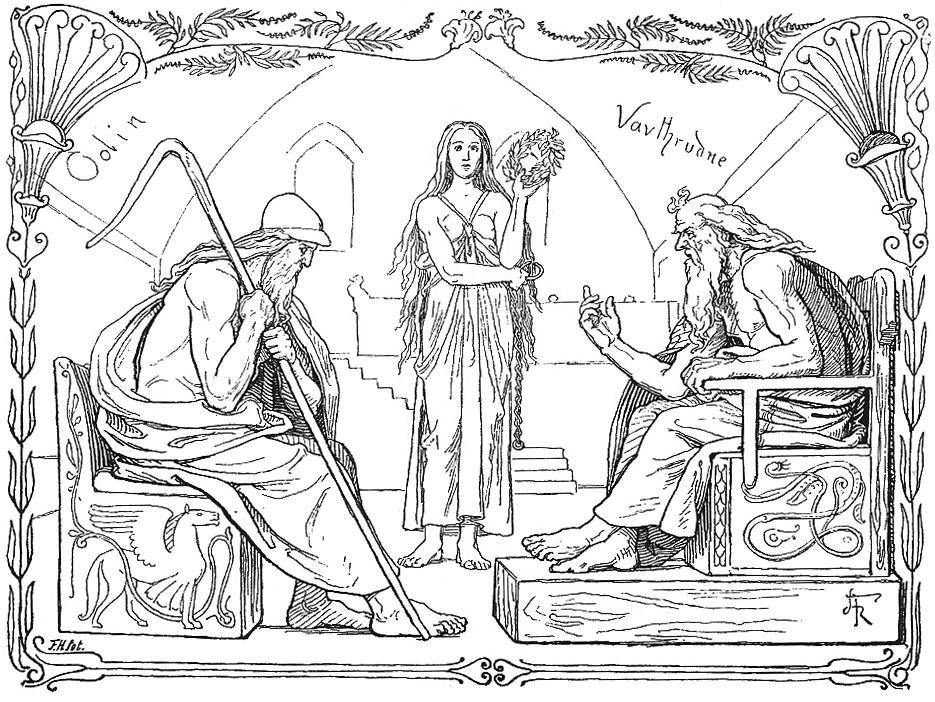
Odin and Vafþrúðnir battle in a game of knowledge (1895) by Lorenz Frølich.

Vafþrúðnismál (Old Norse: 'The Lay of Vafþrúðnir') is the third poem in the Poetic Edda. It is a conversation in verse form conducted initially between the Æsir Odin and Frigg, and subsequently between Odin and the jötunn Vafþrúðnir, as they engage in a battle of wits. The poem goes into detail about the Norse cosmogony and was evidently used extensively as a source document by Snorri Sturluson in the construction of the Prose Edda who quotes it. The poem is preserved in Codex Regius and partially in AM 748 I 4to. There are preservation problems relating to stanzas 40-41. Vafþrúðnismál is believed to be a 10th century poem.

== Structure ==
The poem consists of 55 stanzas in total, which are composed in a ljóðaháttr meter. Stanzas 1-4 are a conversation between Odin and Frigg, which set up the plotline and stanza 5 sends him off on his journey. Stanzas 6-55 are solely between Gagnráð (Odin) and Vafþrúðnir.

== Synopsis ==
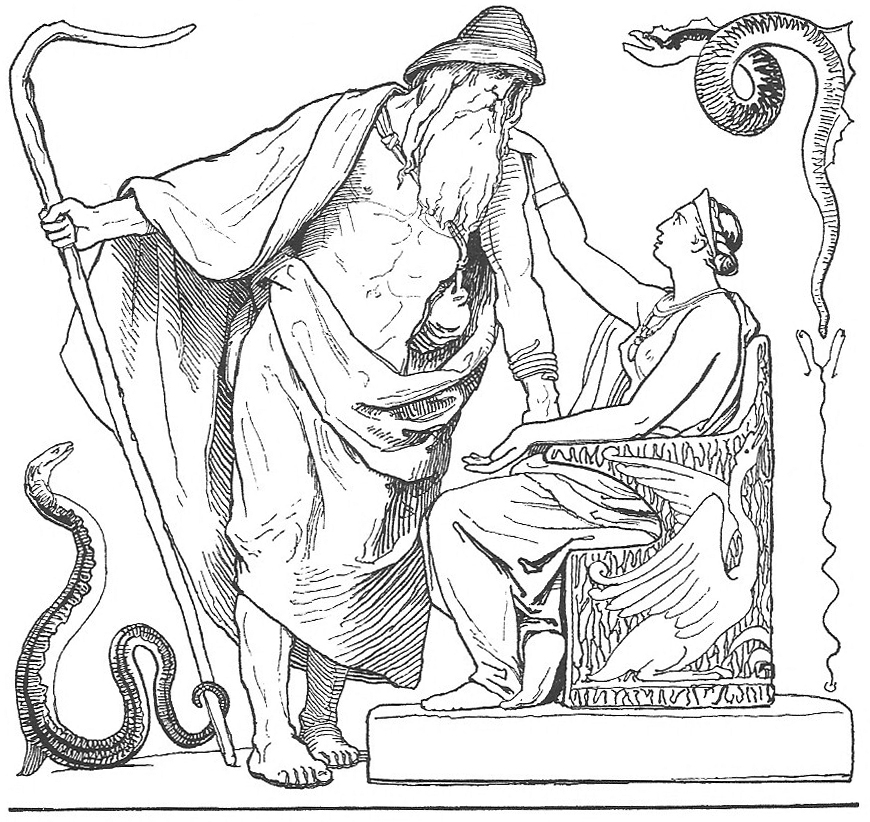
A depiction of Frigg asking Odin not to go to Vafþrúðnir (1895) by Lorenz Frølich.

The lay commences with Odin asking advice and directions of Frigg as to whether it would be wise to seek out the hall of Vafþrúðnir to compete with the all-wise jötunn in a contest of knowledge. Frigg counsels against this course of action, saying that Vafþrúðnir is the most powerful one she knows. Nevertheless Odin continues with his quest.

On arriving at Vafþrúðnir's hall, Odin seeks to test Vafþrúðnir's wisdom through the classic mechanism of a wisdom contest. Vafþrúðnir's response is to accept the wanderer in his hall and only allow him to leave alive if Odin proves to be wiser. Odin, a master of dissimulation, attempts to pass himself off as Gagnráðr (trans. "victory"), and beseeches the traditional hospitality which should be afforded to wayfarers. Vafþrúðnir, wrong-footed, invites him in and to seat himself. A game of riddling then ensues between the pair.

During the course of stanza 19, Vafþrúðnir was unwise enough to wager his head in the case of defeat: victory for Odin will result in his death. In stanza 55, at the conclusion of the contest, Vafþrúðnir is obliged to capitulate to Odin's cunning when Odin asks him what Odin whispered in Baldr's ear prior to Baldr's body being placed on the funerary ship, a question to which only Odin knows the answer; it is a rule of the wisdom contest that questions could only be asked to which the questioner knew the answer and so it is at this point that Vafþrúðnir recognizes his guest for who he is:

You alone know that, what long ago
You said in the ears of your son.
I doomed myself when I dared to tell
What fate will befall the gods,
And staked my wit against the wit of Odin,
Ever the wisest of all.

Vafþrúðnismál 55, translated by Auden and Taylor
