= Nafnaþulur =

Subsection of the Prose Edda

Nafnaþulur (Old Norse: [ˈnɑvnɑˌθulur]) is a subsection of the Prose Edda, the last part of the Skáldskaparmál. It is a listing in verse of names that may be used in poetry for various items, such as gods, jötnar, people, animals, and weapons.

The verses are not in all manuscripts of the Edda and appear independently, and are probably a later addition to Snorri's original composition; they may have been one of its sources. They are often omitted from editions and translations of the Edda.
