= Sacred tree =

Tree which a community deems to hold religious significance

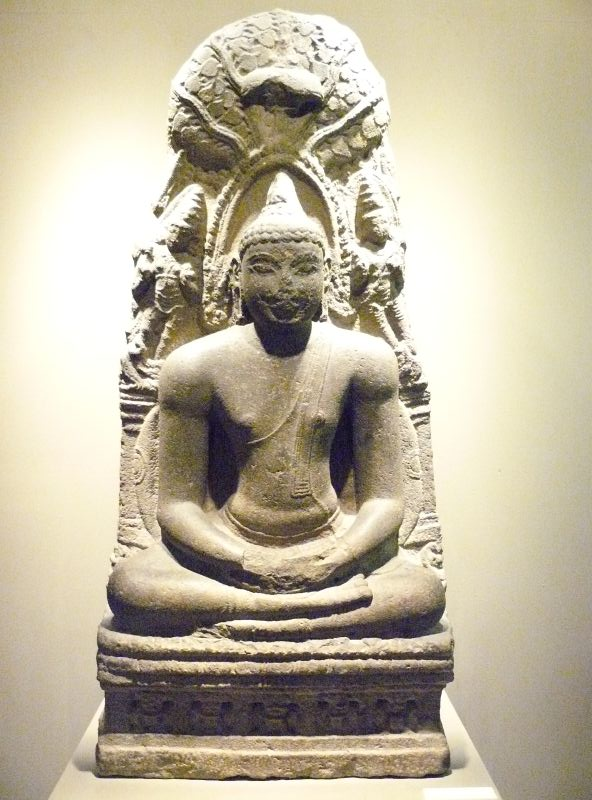
Sculpture of the Buddha meditating under the Maha Bodhi Tree of Bodh Gaya, India

A sacred tree or holy tree is a tree which is considered to be sacred, or worthy of spiritual respect or reverence. Such trees appear throughout world history in various cultures, including the ancient Hindu mythology, Greek, Celtic and Germanic mythologies. They also continue to hold profound meaning in contemporary culture in places like Japan (shinboku), Korea (dangsan namu), India (bodhi tree), and the Philippines, among others. Tree worship is core part of religions which include aspects of animism as core elements of their belief, which is the belief that trees, forests, rivers, mountains, etc. have a life force ('anime', i.e., alive).

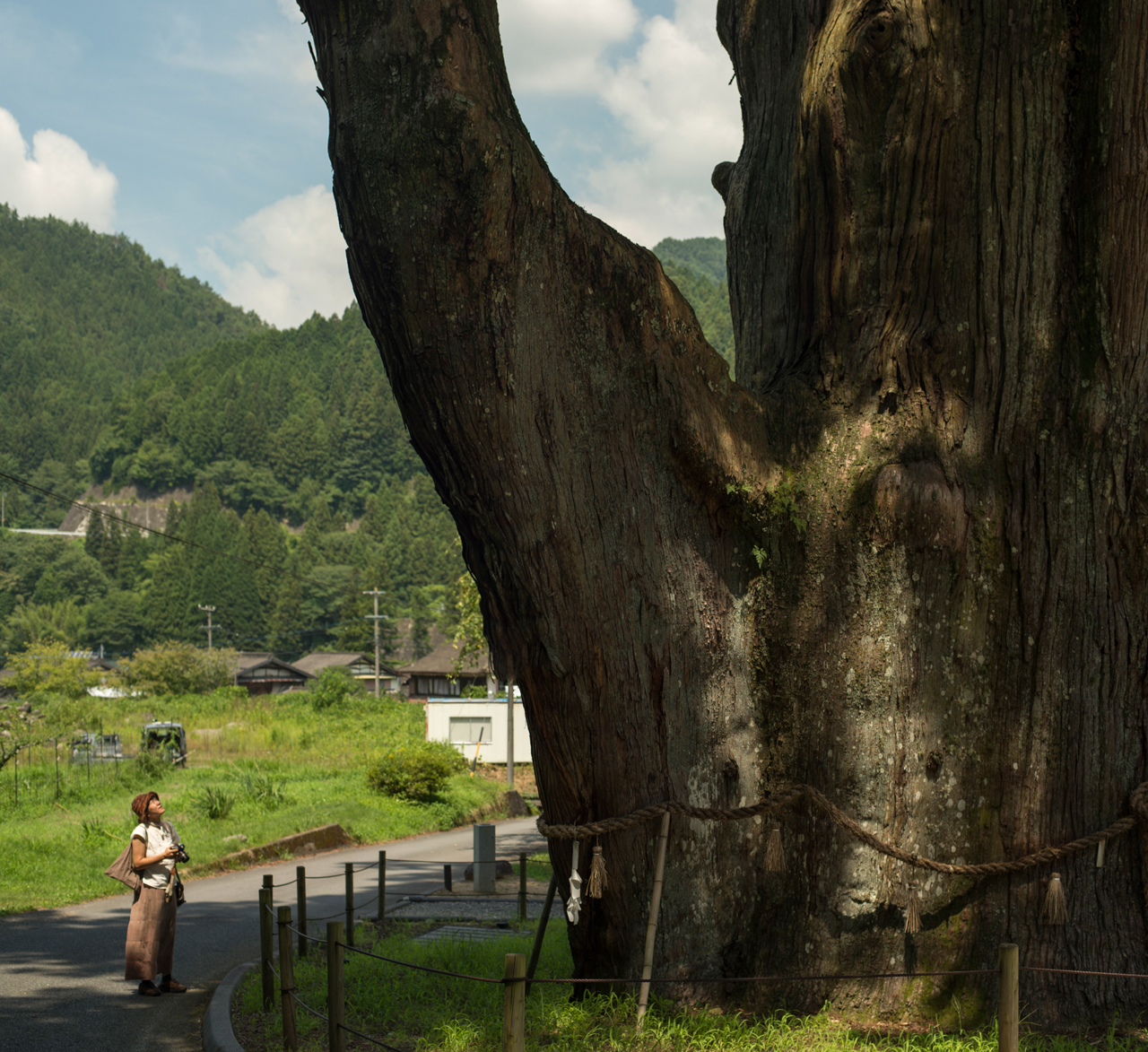
Tsukise no Osugi is a 1,800-year-old sacred tree in Japan's Nagano Prefecture.

An example of the continued importance of sacred trees in contemporary urban culture is the 700-year old camphor growing in the middle of Kayashima Station. Locals protested against moving the tree when the railway station had to be expanded, so the station was built around it. The sacred Banyan tree is the national tree of India, and the Bodhi Tree under which the Buddha is said to have meditated in Bodh Gaya, is also revered as sacred.

Sacred trees are sometimes planted in sacred groves, which may also have other types of trees too.

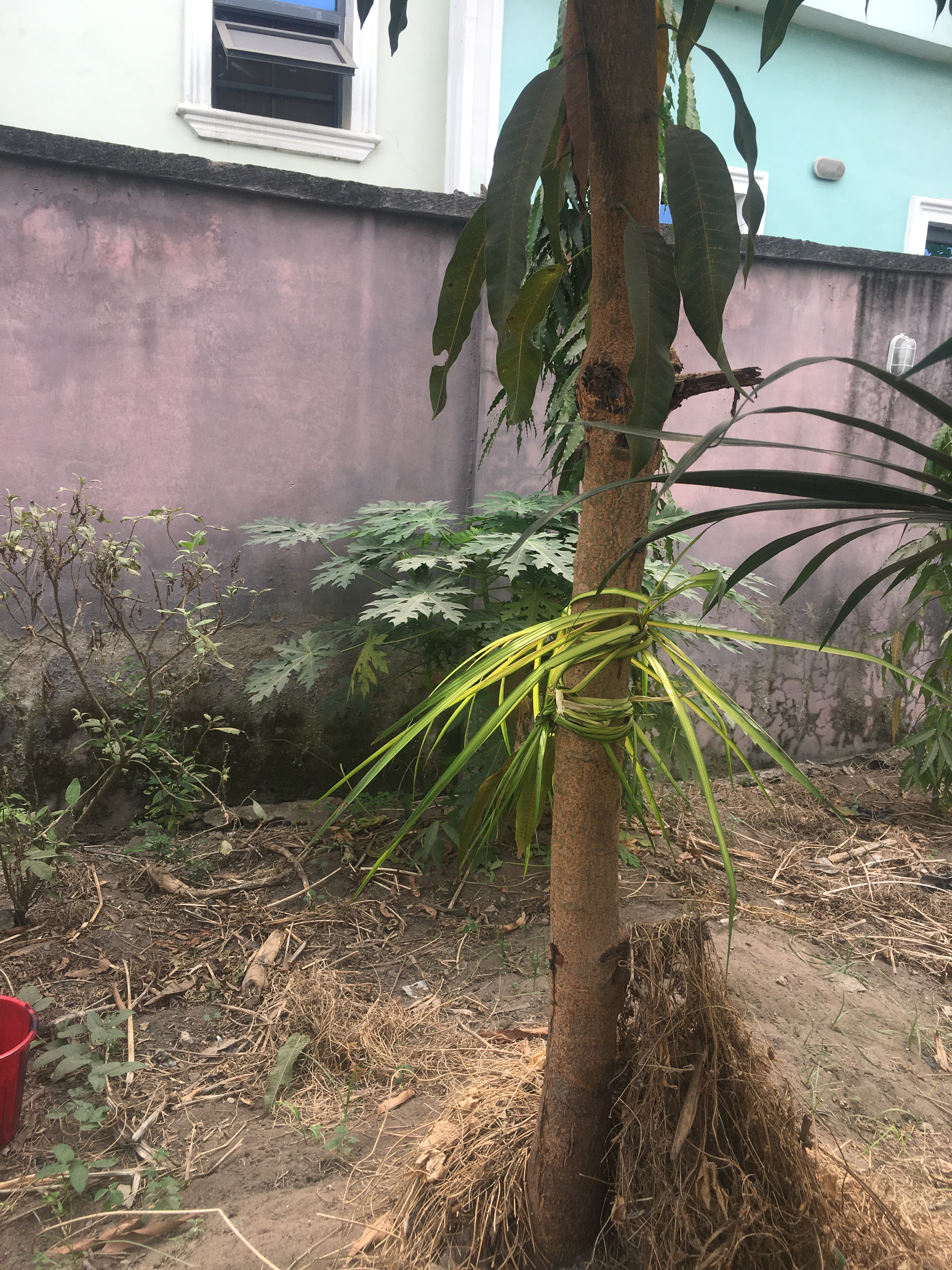
Sacred tree

== Sacred trees in mythology ==
Trees in mythology are the trees that appear in the folklore genre of myth. Certain varieties of tree, such as the tree of life and the world tree appear in numerous mythologies and religions.

== Sacred trees and plants by religion and regions ==
=== European pagan religions ===
==== Celtic ====
The word druid may derive from the Proto-Celtic *dru-wid, meaning "oak-wise" or "tree-knower," suggesting that the Celtic priestly class itself was connected to practices involving sacred trees.

===== Irish =====
The sacred trees of Ireland were celebrated in early literature and could be found growing at inauguration sites. The Hewing or cutting down of an enemies sacred tree was considered as an act of war and symbolic conquest. References to sacred trees could be found in Irish Annals up to the 12th century.

===== Welsh =====
The island of Anglesey (Ynys Môn) was a center for druidic training in the ancient world. During the Roman conquest in 60 CE, this druidic stronghold was deliberately weakened when general Gaius Suetonius Paulinus destroyed the sacred groves (nemeta) of the island.

==== Germanic ====
Yggdrasil (also known as Mímameiðr, Læraðr, and Hoddmímis holt) is a large tree in North Germanic mythology believed to connect all worlds. Beneath it sits Urðarbrunnr, a mythological well. Upon Yggdrasil, Odin sacrificed himself to gain knowledge of the runes, which he used to aid humainty. Líf and Lífþrasir are foretold to survive Ragnorok by hiding in the tree.

==== Serbian ====
The zapis is the sacred tree in Serbian Orthodox tradition.

=== Christian religions ===
Many trees, groves and gardens are considered sacred inside Christianity. In Ireland sacred trees were associated ecclesiastical sites, holy wells and specific saints. Many Christians adopted the practise of celebrating Evergreen trees for winter festivals in December. This was a common practice due to the belief that Evergreens have long lives and would be cut down and decorated. Eventually this practice became a part of the Christmas festival of Christianity.

Most notably the Gethsemane, the location where Jesus was betrayed by Judas Iscariot (agony in the Garden) according to the bible. The garden thereby became a common pilgrimage site. Saints associated with specific trees and locations also became pilgrimage sites in early Christianity.

In the Book of Mormon, the prophet Lehi and his son Nephi described a vision concerning a sacred tree bearing fruit that reflects God's love for His children: "Yea, it is the love of God, which sheddeth itself abroad in the hearts of the children of men; wherefore, it is the most desirable above all things.

=== Indic religions ===
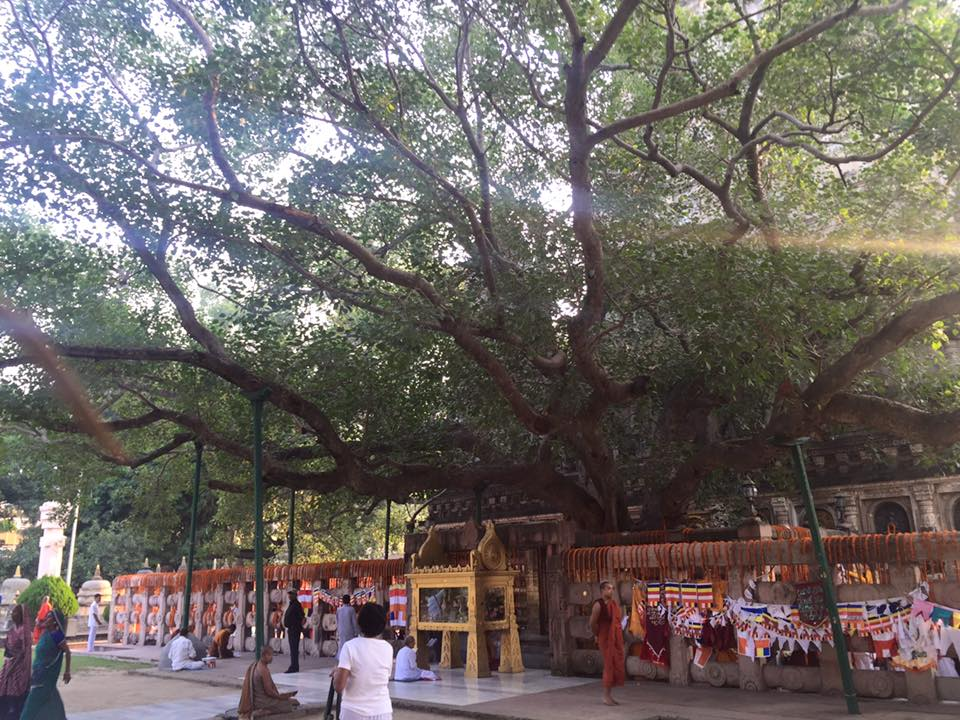
The Mahabodhi tree in Bodhgaya.

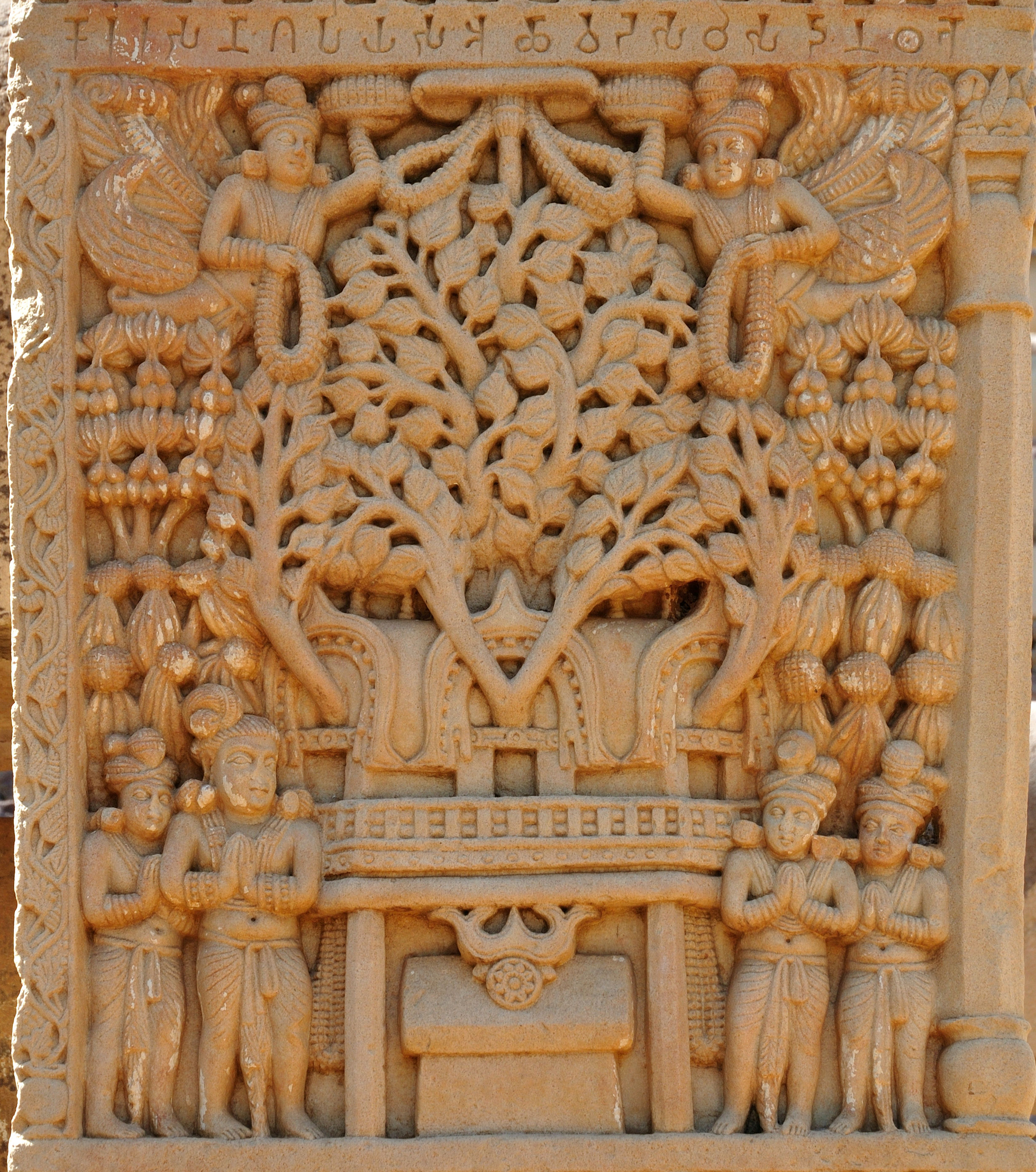
Stone illustration dating to 1st century CE, of the "tree temple" at Bodh Gaya in India, around the sacred Bodhi tree.

In the Indian religions of Hinduism, Buddhism and Jainism, the ecology, such as trees, rivers, fauna, and mountains, is sacred and revered objects of worship. There are numerous sacred groves of India. In Hindu belief, the Kalpavriksha is a wish granting tree. In addition to the Panchvati trees described below, other sacred trees include species such as the Akshayavat (sacred fig tree), Banana leaf, Kadamba, Parijata, and Sandalwood. The Bodhi Tree (banyan) is specially revered, and there are numerous large banyan trees in India. Matsya Purana, a Hindu text, has a Sanskrit language shloka (hymn), which explains the importance of reverence of ecology in Hinduism. It states, "A pond equals ten wells, a reservoir equals ten ponds, while a son equals ten reservoirs, and a tree equals ten sons." Many parts of plants and trees are prescribed in the Vedic rituals. Some of the most significant trees referred to in the Vedic literature in the context of śrauta rituals are these: Banyan (Ficus benghalensis), Peepul (Ficus religiosa), Bastard teak (Butea monosperma - flame of the forest), Pikhan (Ficus infectoria - Plaksha), Cluster fig tree (Ficus Glomerata - Indian fig or Goolar), Prickly pear (Ficus indica), Bilwa or Bael (Aegle marmalose), Khejri (Prosopis spicigera - Spunge tree), Silk cotton (Salmalia malabarica), Cutch tree (Acacia catechu), Myrobalan (Terminalia Ballerica), White teak (Gmelina Arborea) and Indian plum (Flacourtia sapida - Kangoo).

==== Triveni groves ====
Triveni is a grove of 3 specific trees sacred to Indian-origin religions (Hinduism, Buddhism and Jainism), which are the vata (Ficus benghalensis, banyan), ashvattha (ficus religiosa, Peepal) and Nimba (azadirachta indica, neem).

==== Panchavati groves ====
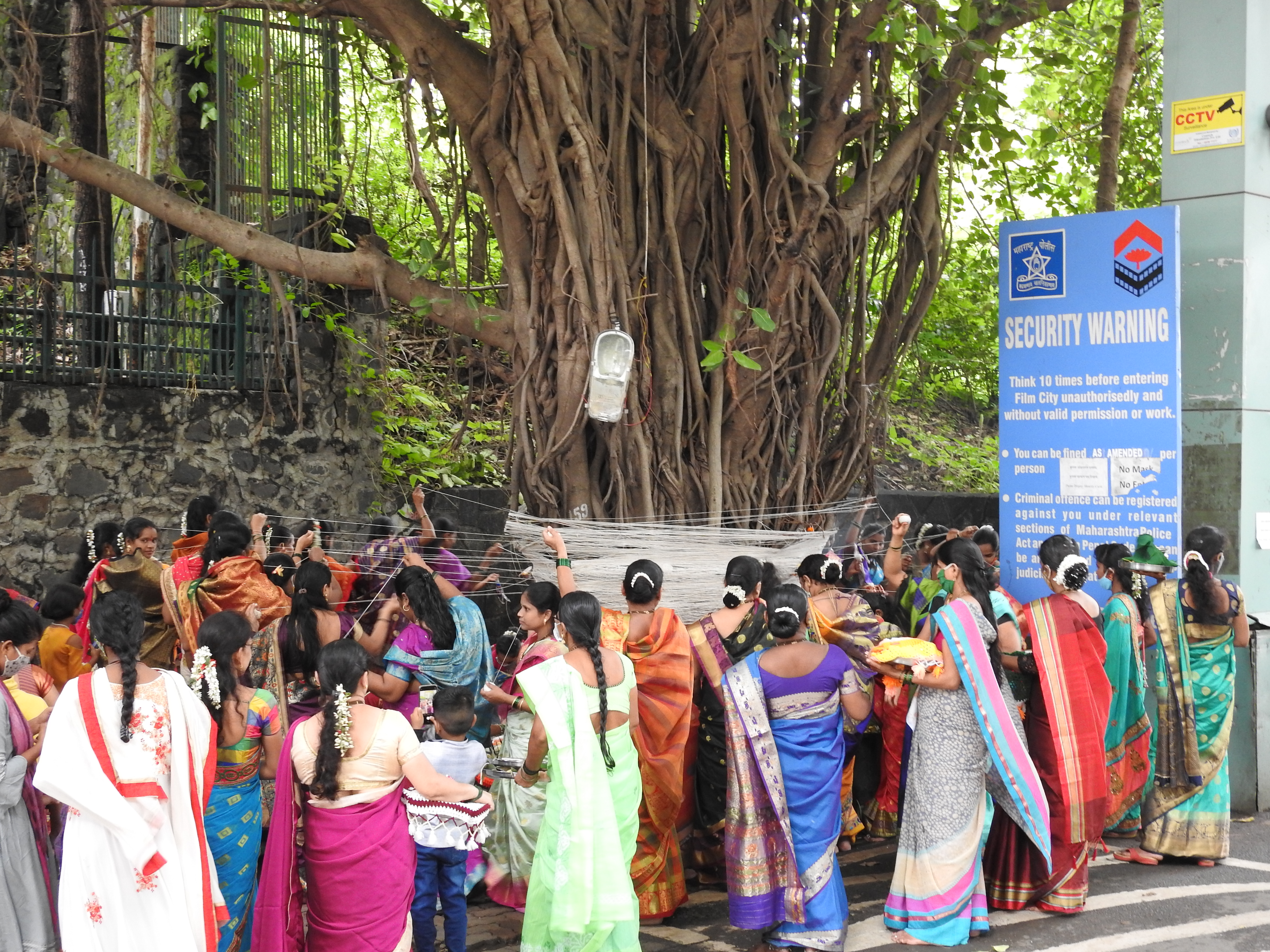
During Vat Purnima festival married women tying threads around a banyan tree.

Panchavati, are groves of five trees sacred to Indian-origin religions, such as Hinduism, Buddhism and Jainism. Panchavati has five types of sacred trees, however there are more than five types of trees which are considered sacred and form the part of panchavati. Sacred trees used in panchavati are the Vata (ficus benghalensis, Banyan), Ashvattha (ficus religiosa, Peepal), Bilva (aegle marmelos, Bengal Quince), Amalaki (phyllanthus emblica, Indian Gooseberry, Amla), Ashoka (Saraca asoca, Ashok), Udumbara (ficus racemosa, Cluster Fig, Gular), Nimba (Azadirachta indica, Neem) and Shami (prosopis spicigera, Indian Mesquite).

Forests Department, Haryana has initiated a state-wide program to plant panchavati groves in each village, which will be planted along the temples, ponds, and common land. From 2021, land was identified in villages for planting these groves which will be looked after by the villagers. Within each grove, peepal will be planted in the east, banyan in the north, bel in the centre, amla in the west and ashoka tree in the south.

==== Sacred plants ====
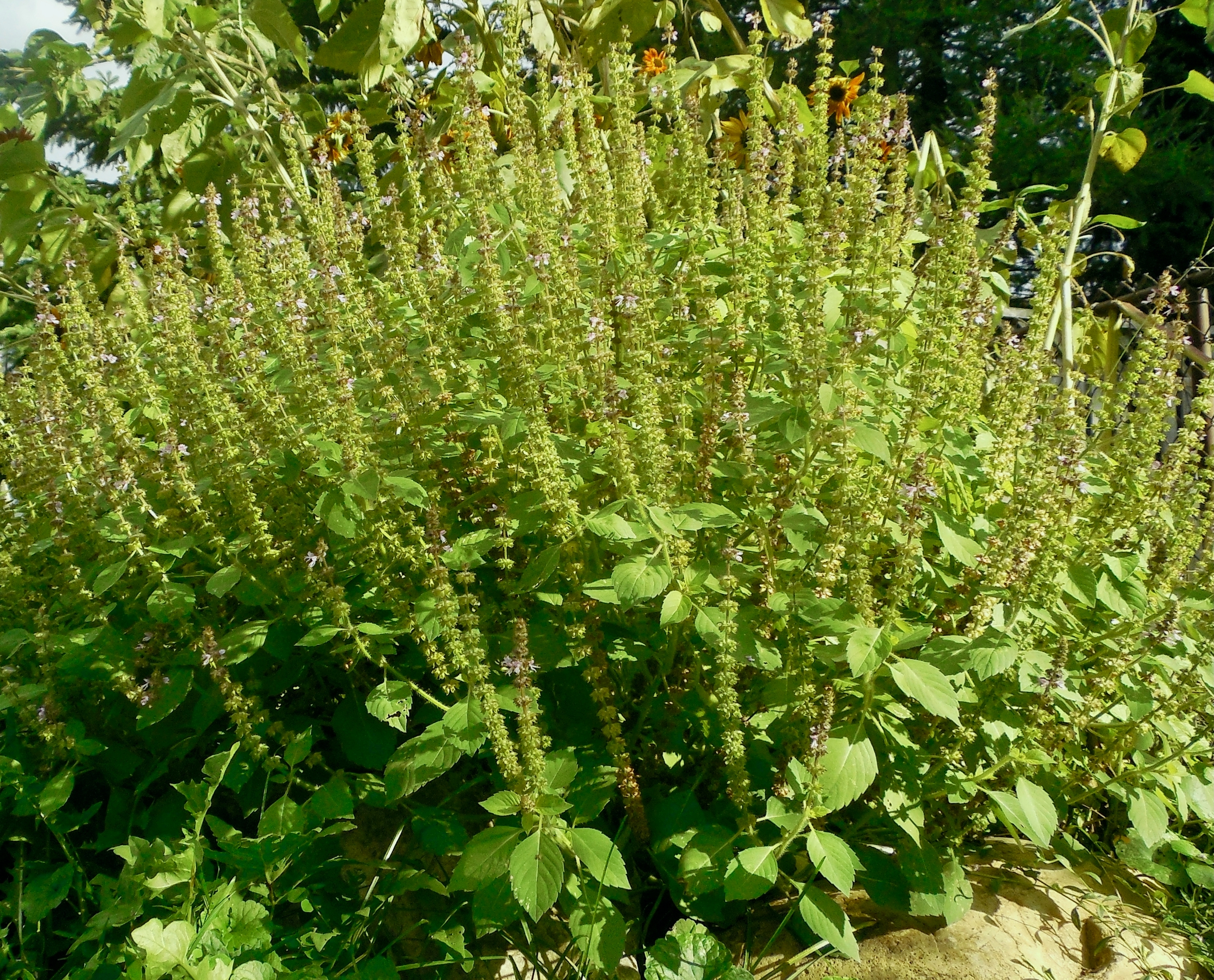
a holy basil plant (Ocimum tenuiflorum) with fully mature flowers.

The sacred fruits and plants include the Bael, Kusha grass, Tulasi (see Tulasi chaura and Tulasi Vivaha), flowers such as Lotus, Champaka, coconut, paan (betal leaf), banana leaf, etc. are also sacred. Tulsi in India is cultivated for religious and traditional medicinal purposes, and also for its essential oil. It is widely used as a herbal tea, commonly used in Ayurveda, and has a place within the Vaishnava tradition of Hinduism, in which devotees perform worship involving holy basil plants or leaves. The sacred flowers include the Lotus, Champaka and Marigold.

==== Sikhism ====
There are a number of trees considered sacred in Sikhism. Many of the sacred trees are associated with miraculous sakhis or historical events. The Dukh Bhanjani Ber (meaning "the tree which removes sorrows") is a jujube tree located within the Harmandir Sahib complex in Amritsar. Sikhs believe a leper, who was the husband of Bibi Rajani, was cured after bathing in the small body of water near this tree and that the tree was named as Dukh Bhanjani by Guru Ram Das. The tree is commonly used as a prayer site for saying petitionary prayers to God, such as ones asking God for cures regarding severe, unknown, and untreatable diseases and infertility. The small body of water that once existed near the tree was believed to have existed since ancient times. Another jujuba tree associated with Guru Nanak is at Gurdwara Ber Sahib in Sultanpur Lodhi. Sikhs believe that Guru Nanak revealed the Mul Mantar near the tree.

=== Japan ===
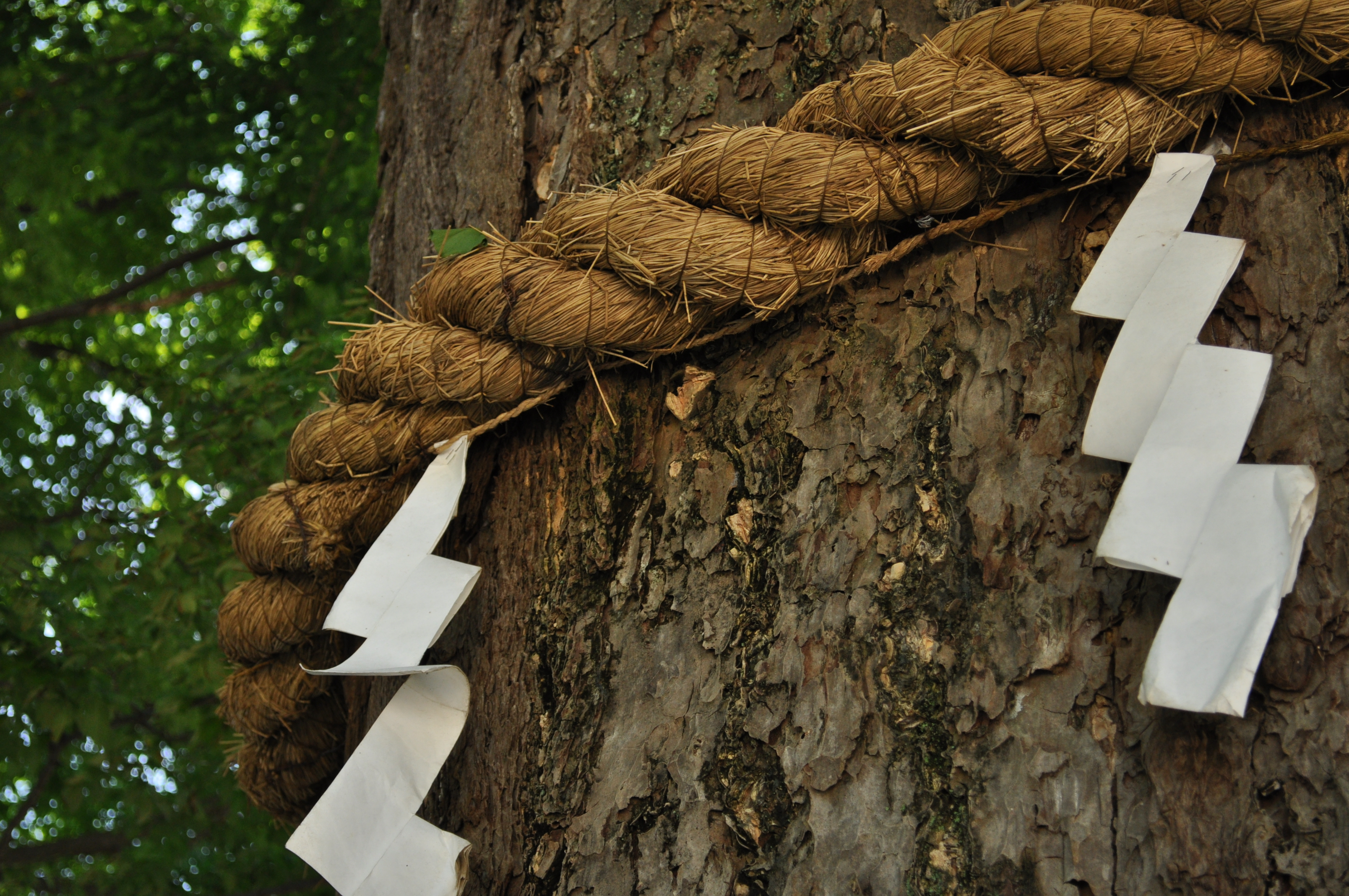
A 'shimenawa' rope is wrapped around a sacred guardian tree at one of Japan's Hachiman Shrines.

Sacred trees, called shinboku, are a deeply ingrained part of a Japanese culture that has historically viewed itself as being united with nature, rather than separate from nature; thus, recognizing the sacredness of trees, stones, mountains, forests, and the elements has been a relatively constant theme in Japanese culture for thousands of years. In the present day Japan, shinboku are trees inhabited by kami (spirits or deities) and can readily be found in many of the 100,000 Shinto shrines existing in throughout the country. Although any tree can technically become a shinboku through a Shinto ritual process of inviting a kami to inhabit it, most shinboku are particularly large or aesthetically interesting examples of endemic species such as camphor, ginkgo, or Japanese cedar. The oldest shinboku are estimated to be several thousands years in age. Because shinboku are viewed as being literal sanctuaries, inhabited by kami, they are protected as a physical and spiritual embodiment of the divine nature. In most cases, Shinboku can be easily identified by the straw or hemp rope called a shimenawa which is typically wrapped around the tree; the rope acts as both a sign of the tree's sacredness, and also as a protective barrier between the spirit world and the human world.

In addition to individual shinboku, shrines and Buddhist temples are often surrounded by sacred forests called Chinju no Mori, which are considered sacred forests where kami, including spirits of ancestors, dwell.

=== Korea ===
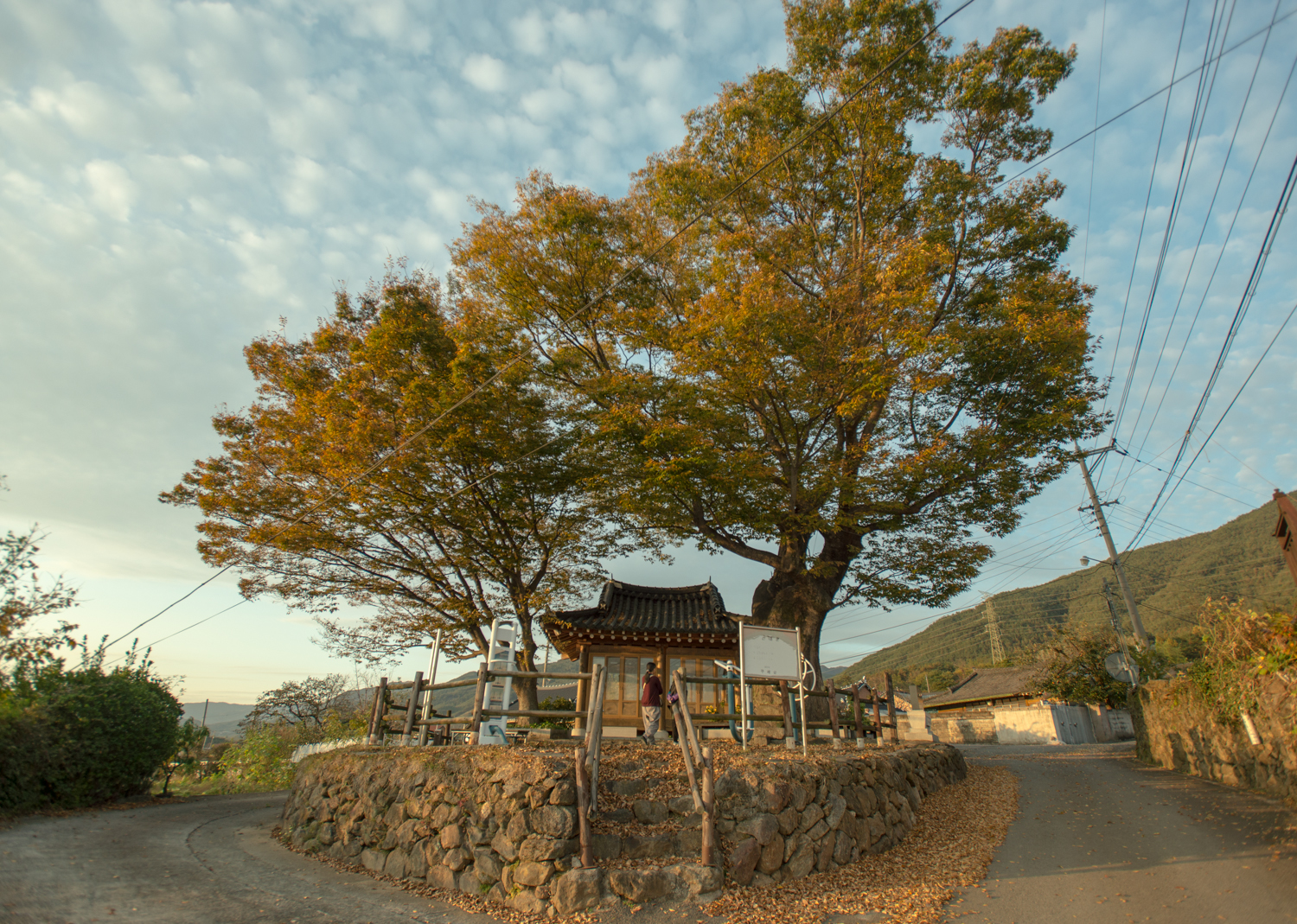
A sacred "Dangsan Namu" tree of the Zelkova species, in Suhan Village, Korea.

In Korea, species such as Zelkova serrata, Pinus koraiensis, and Ginkgo biloba, have been considered a symbol of protection for villages since ancient times, and can still be found planted at central points in cities, towns and villages around the country. The trees, referred to as dangsan namu (god tree) often stand next to small pavilions, serving both as shaded informal gathering points, and spaces for traditional rituals and ceremonies involving prayer and offerings to the tree. The oldest of these trees are estimated to be in excess of 1,000 years in age, and are protected as natural monuments by Korean law.

In 2013, the Korea Forest Research Institute announced a project to clone the sacred zelkova, pine, and ginkgo trees that are identified as natural monuments, so their lineage will not be lost in case of disaster or death due to age.

=== Philippines ===
Indigenous Philippine folk religions practiced in pre-colonial Philippines, are a group of similar indigenous faiths which centers on the community, nature, and the spirits, ancestors, and deities, collectively called anito. Indigenous Philippine shrines and sacred grounds host the sacred trees.

=== United States ===
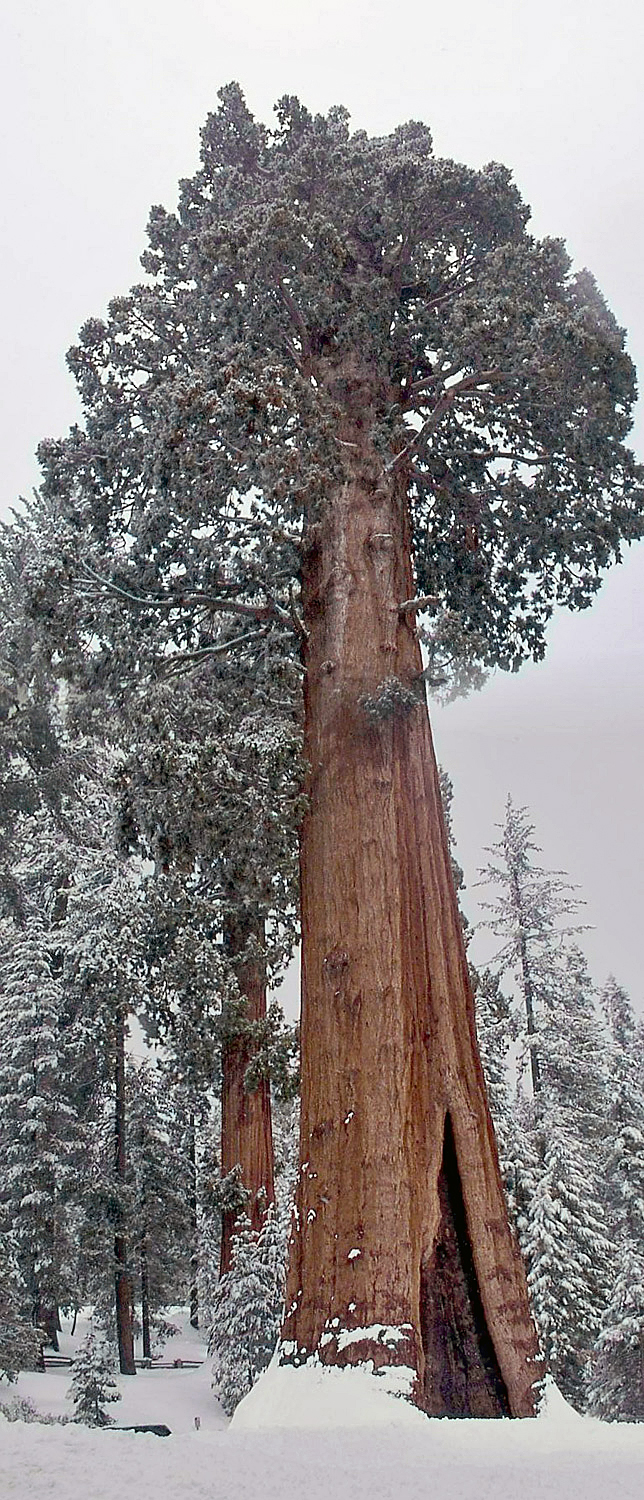
The General Grant Tree is the only living national shrine in the United States.

Giant sequoias, the most massive trees on earth, are viewed as sacred symbols in America. Promoted by John Muir using biblical language after their discovery in the 19th century, these trees helped inspire the creation of the national park system. The General Grant Tree was named the nations' christmas tree by Calvin Coolidge and later declared a national shrine by Dwight Eisenhower. It the only living national shrine in the United States.

.

== Gallery ==
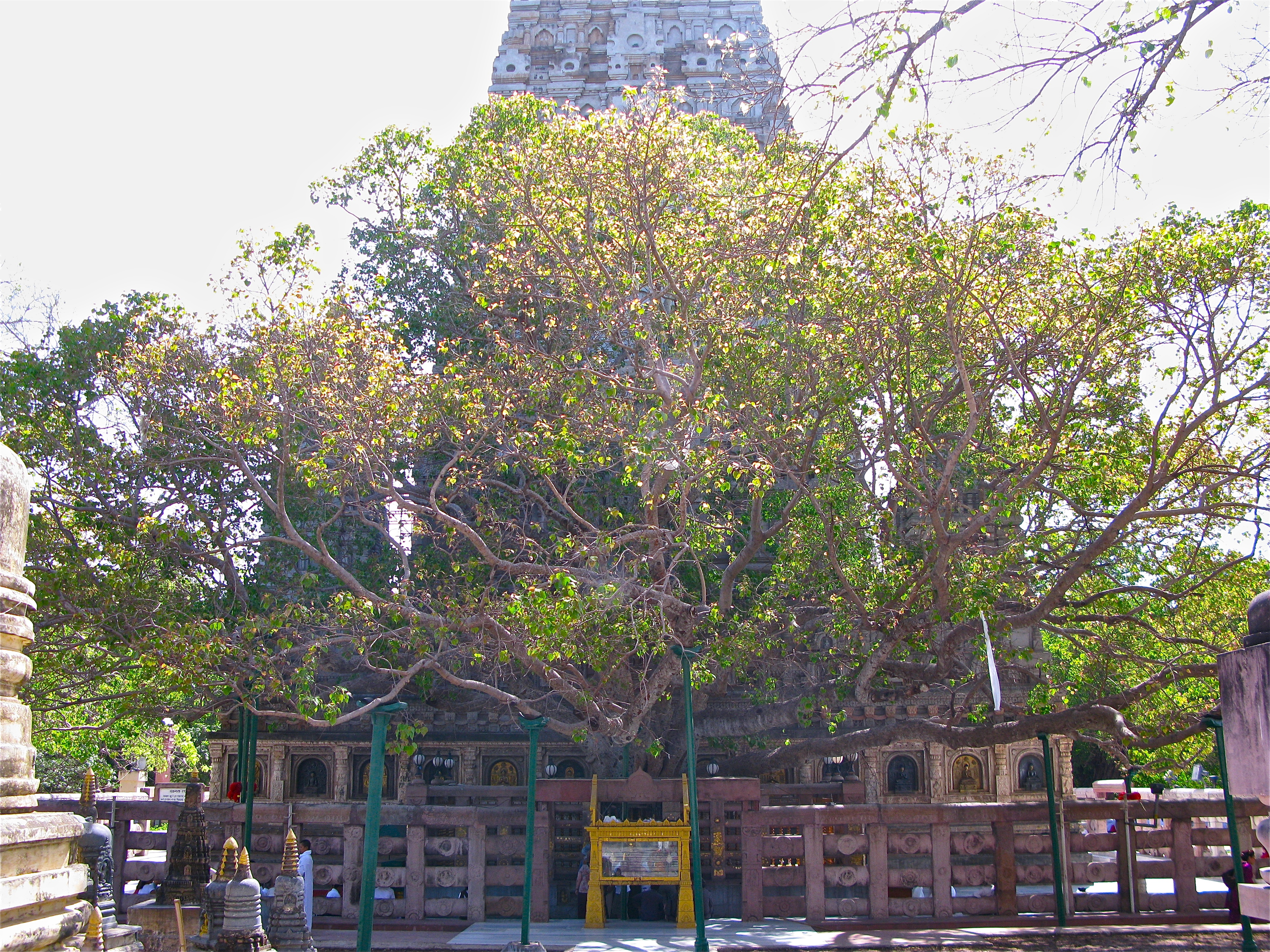
The Mahabodhi Tree at the Mahabodhi Temple complex in Bodh Gaya

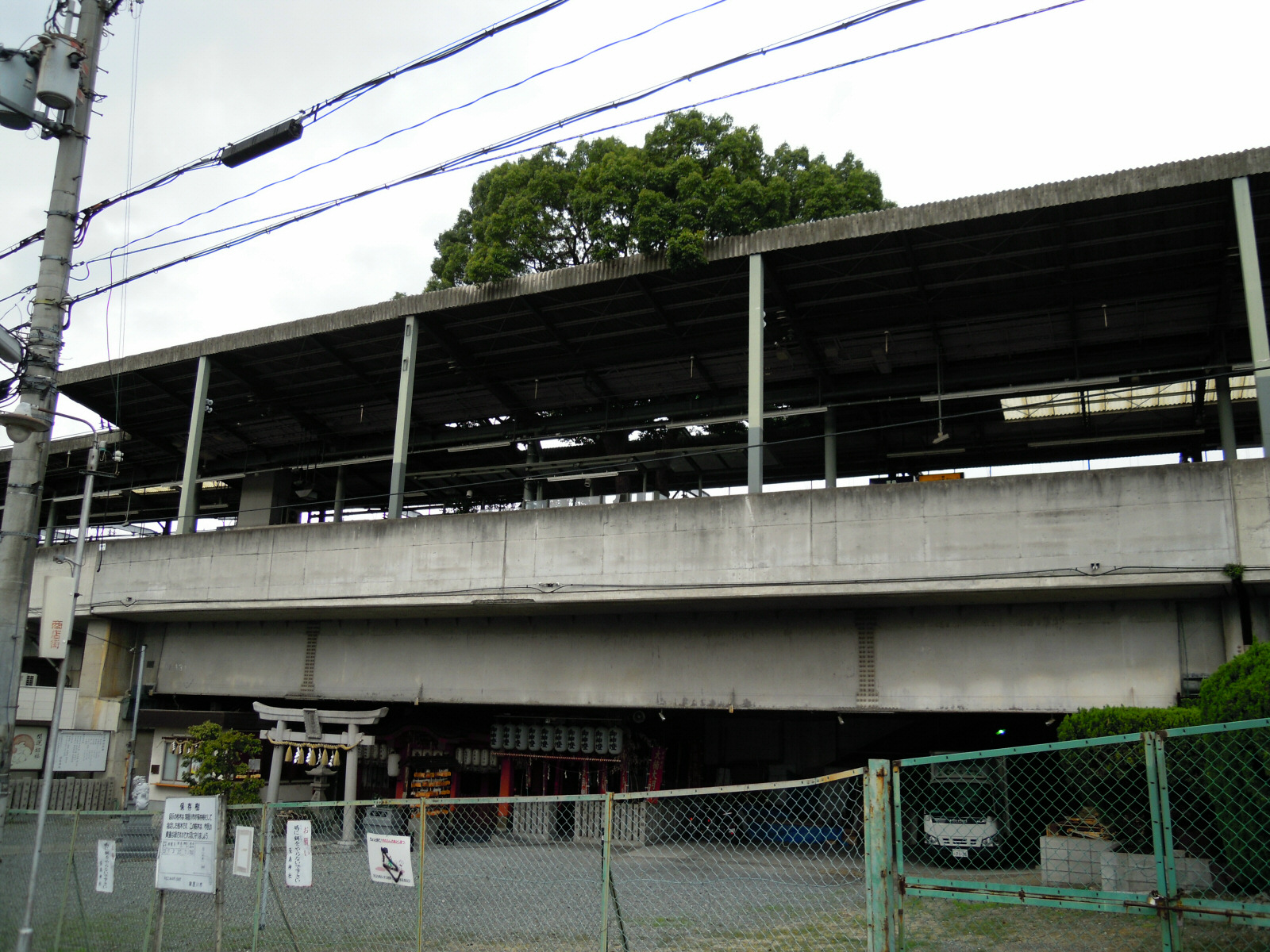
A train station was built around the sacred camphor tree at Kayashima Station in Japan

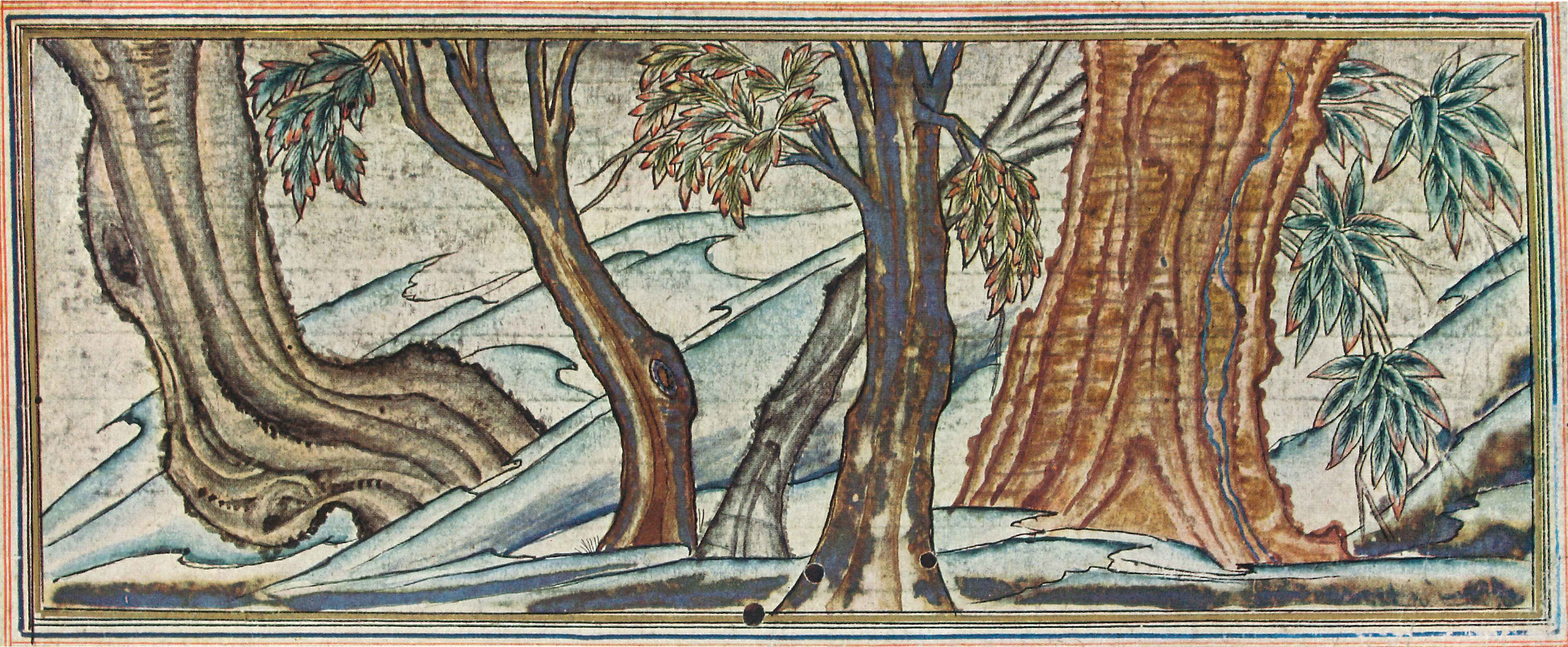
A painting by Rab-i-Rashidi dating to 1314 CE, depicting the sacred tree of Buddha

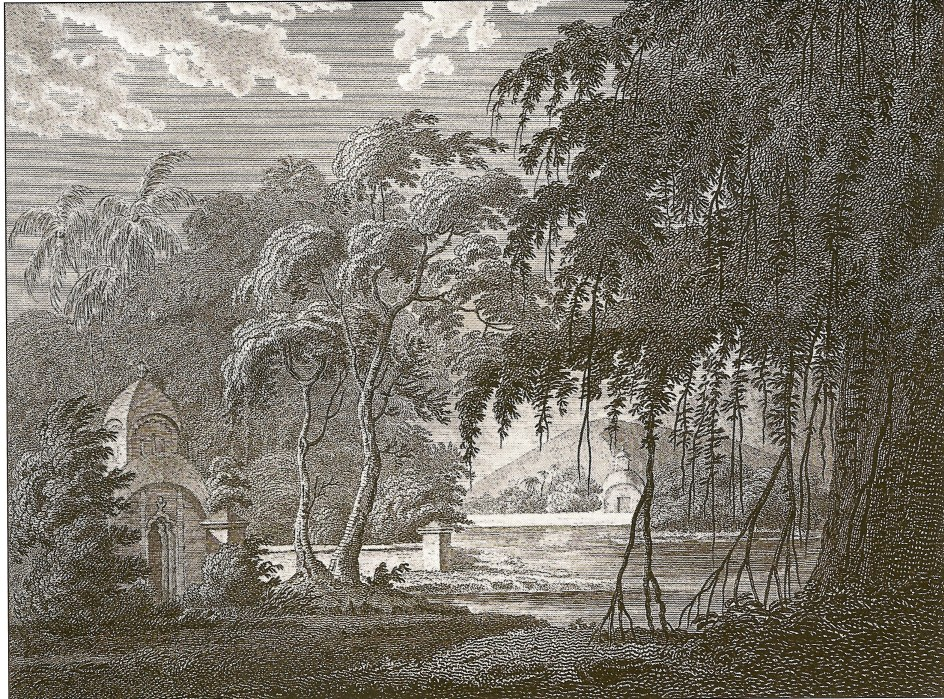
A 1782 drawing of "The Sacred Hindoo Grove near Chandod on the Banks of the Nerbudda" in Bombay, India

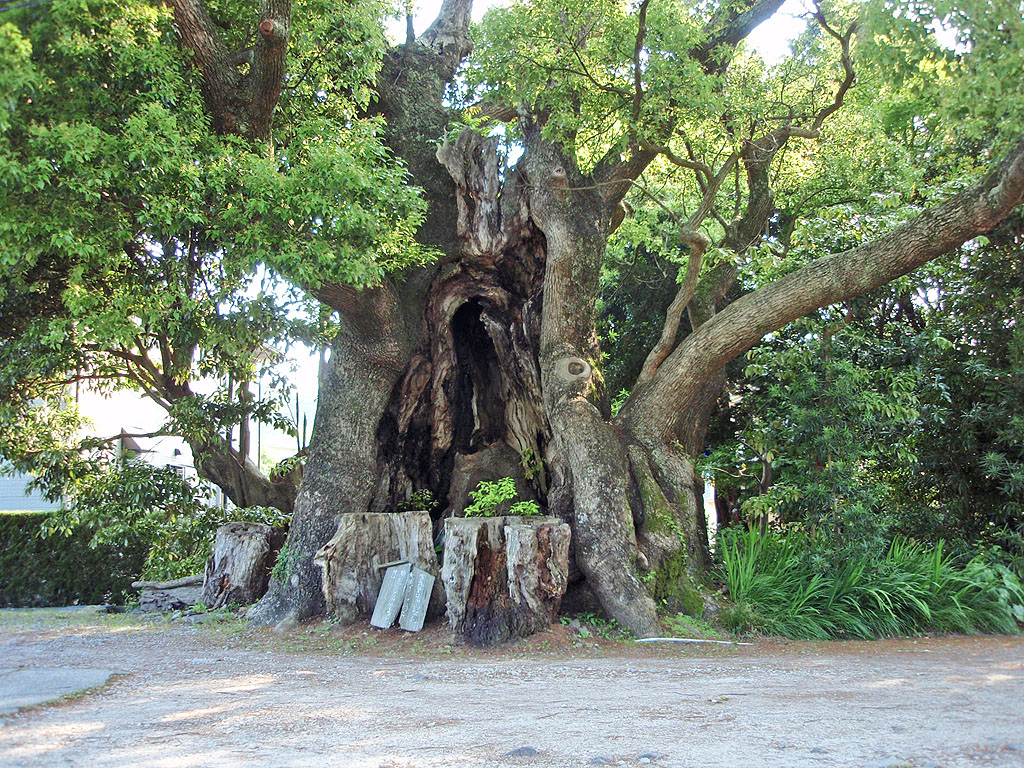
A sacred camphor tree in Kawazu, Shizuoka Prefecture, Japan

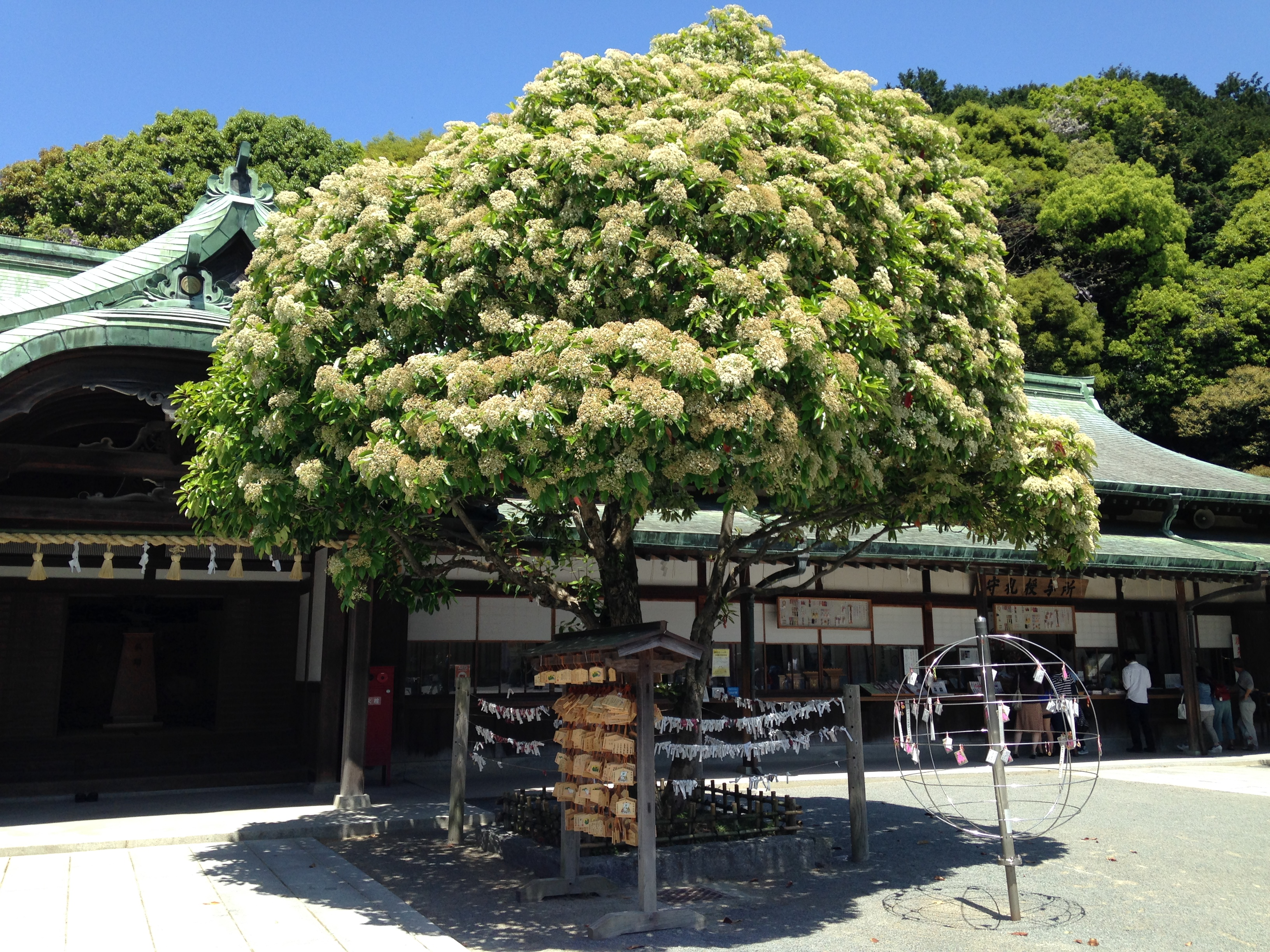
Sacred Photinia serrulata tree at Miyajidake Shrine in Fukutsu, Fukuoka, Japan

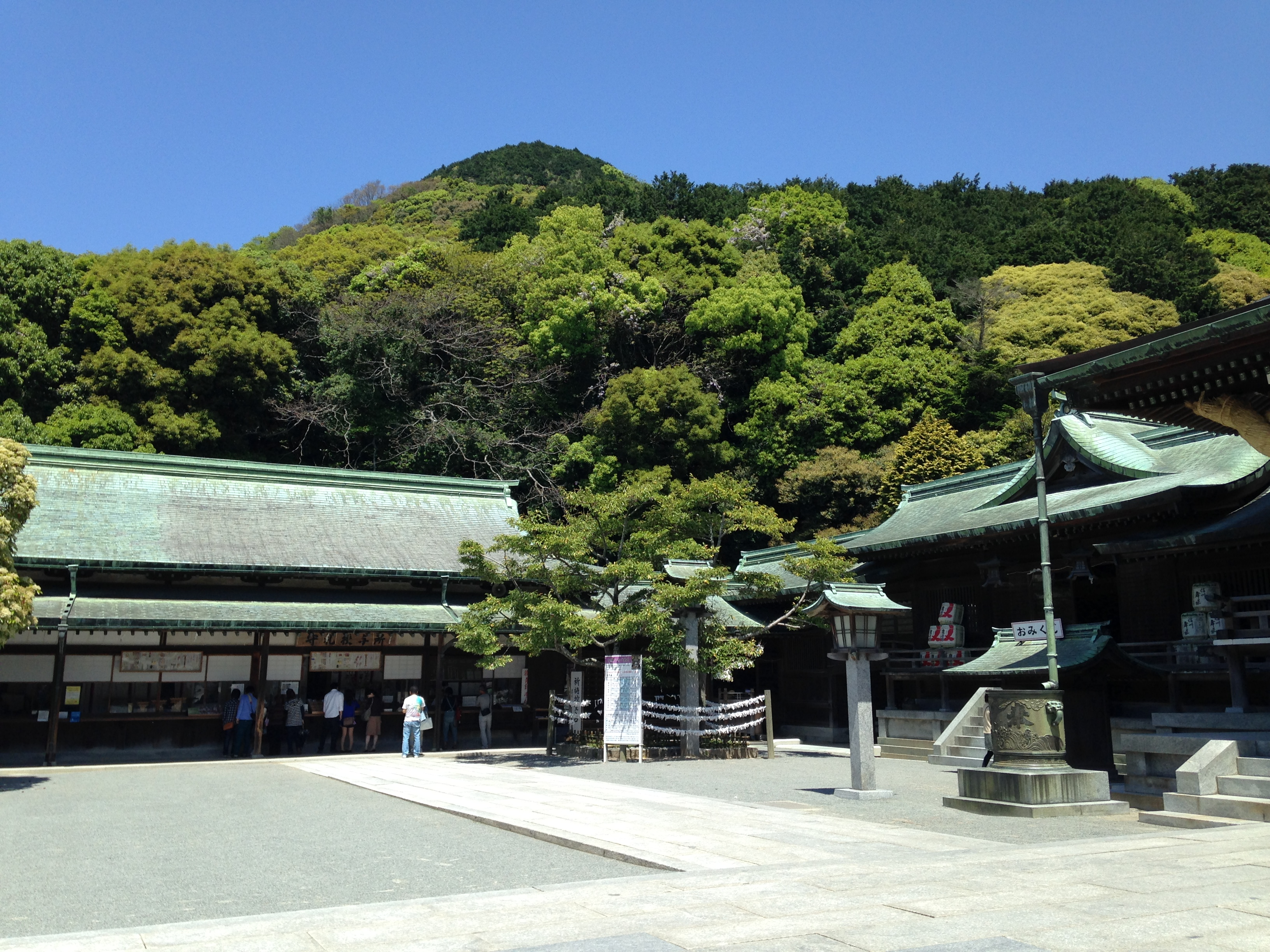
Sacred forest at Miyajidake Shrine in Fukuoka, Japan

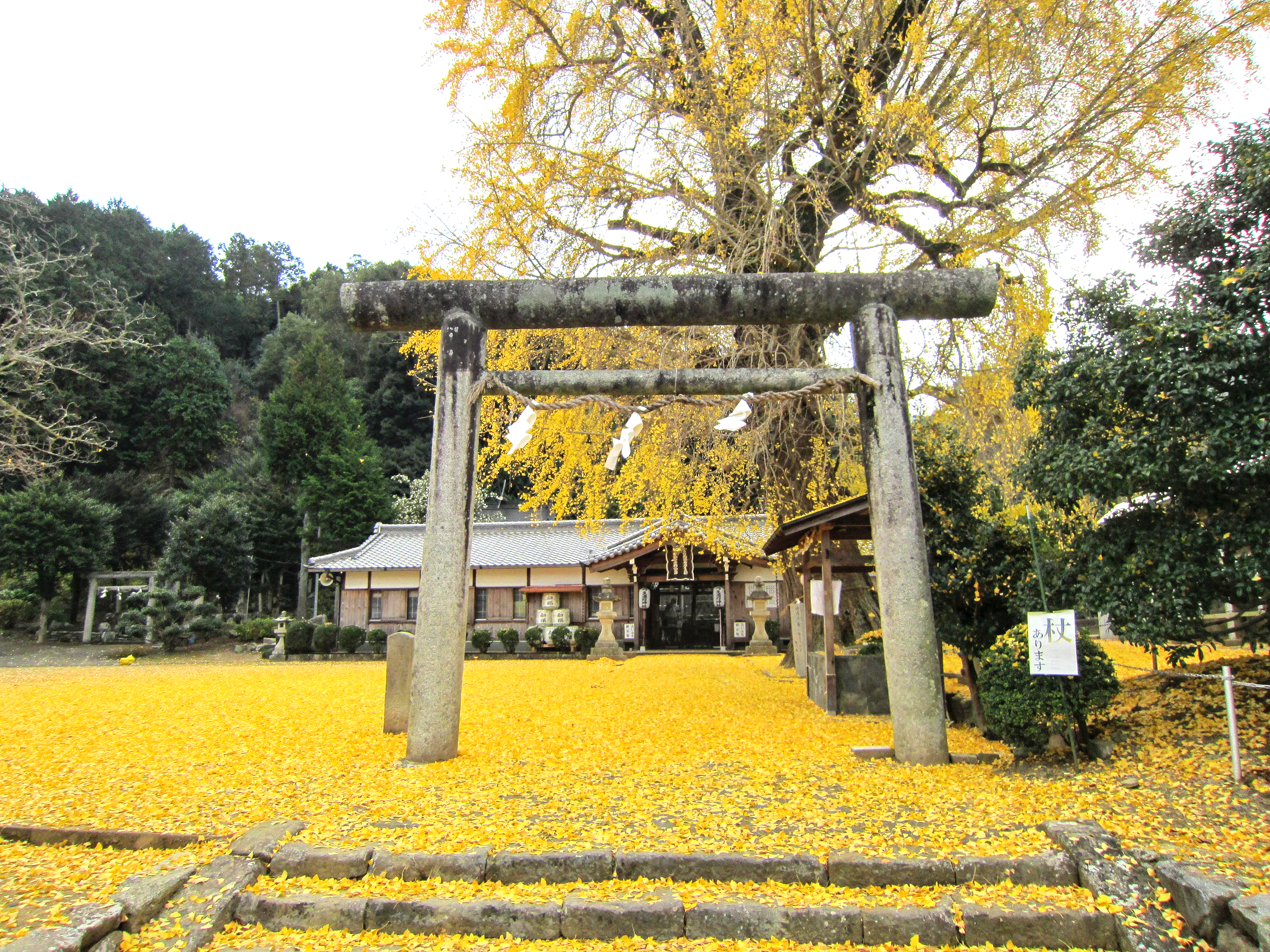
A sacred ginkgo at Nyusakado Shrine in Wakayama, Japan

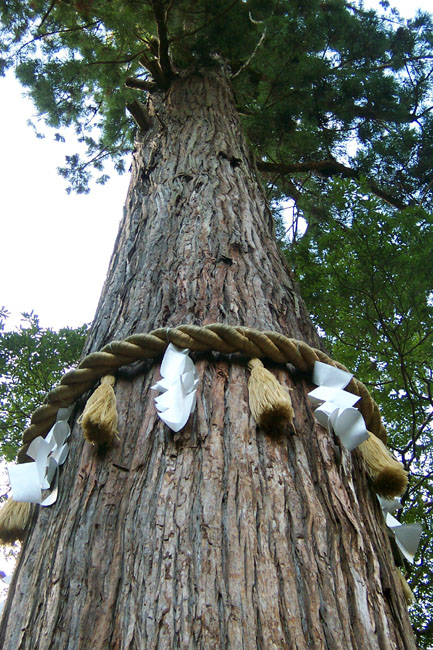
A sacred Sugi tree at the Yūki Shrine in Tsu, Mie, Japan

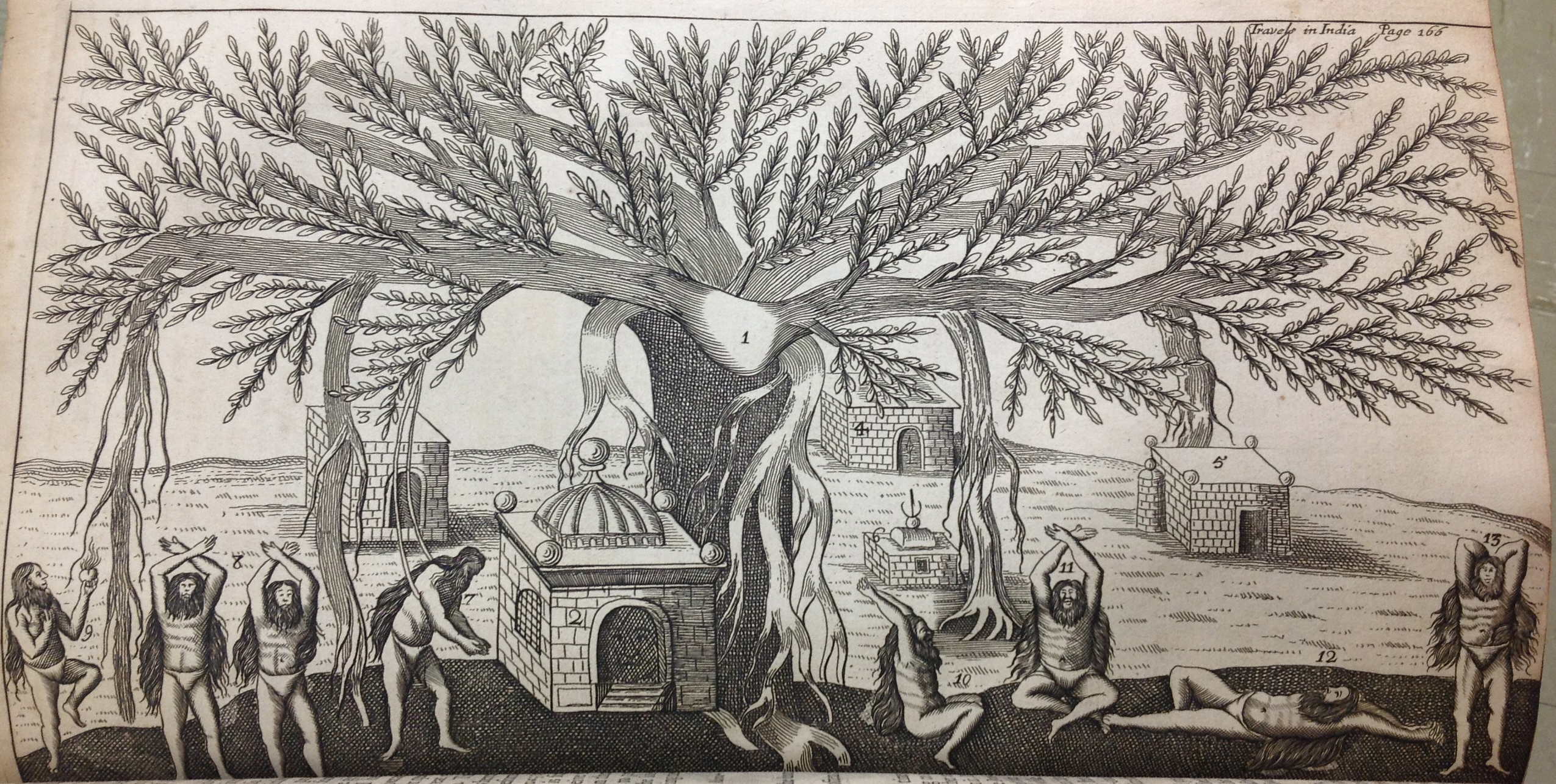
Indian men performing yoga asana under a Banyan tree (1688)

== See also ==
- Wish tree
- Sacred groves
- Sacred mountains
- Sacred natural site
- Sacred rivers
- Sacred site
