= Veðrfölnir and eagle =

Mythical creature in Norse mythology

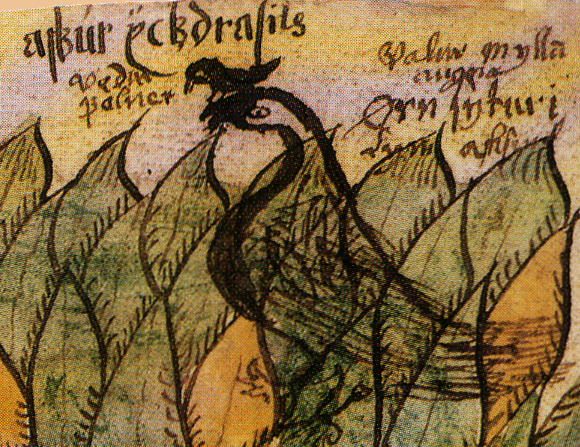
An illustration from a 17th-century Icelandic manuscript shows a hawk, Veðrfölnir, on top of an eagle on top of a tree, Yggdrasil.

In Norse mythology, Veðrfölnir (Old Norse "storm pale", "wind bleached", or "wind-witherer") is a hawk sitting between the eyes of an unnamed eagle that is perched on top of the world tree Yggdrasil. Veðrfölnir is sometimes modernly anglicized as Vedrfolnir, Vedurfolnir or Vetrfolnir.

The unnamed eagle is attested in both the Poetic Edda, compiled in the 13th century from earlier traditional sources, and the Prose Edda, written in the 13th century by Snorri Sturluson, while Veðrfölnir is solely attested in the Prose Edda. In both the Poetic Edda and the Prose Edda, the squirrel Ratatoskr carries messages between the unnamed eagle and Nidhöggr, the worm that resides below the world tree. Scholars have proposed theories about the implications of the birds.

== Attestations ==
Veðrfölnir sits atop the eagle with Ratatoskr nearby (upper right) while Odin sacrifices himself to himself upon the tree Yggdrasil (central) in an illustration (1895) by Lorenz Frølich.

In the Poetic Edda poem Grímnismál, the god Odin (disguised as Grimnir) says that:

Benjamin Thorpe translation: Ratatösk is the squirrel named, who has run in Yggdrasil's ash; he from above the eagle's words must carry, and beneath the Nidhögg repeat.	Henry Adams Bellows translation: Ratatosk is the squirrel who there shall run On the ash-tree Yggdrasil; From above the words of the eagle he bears, And tells them to Nithhogg beneath.

The eagle is again attested in chapter 16 of the Prose Edda book Gylfaginning, yet here with the company of Veðrfölnir. In the chapter, Gangleri (described as king Gylfi in disguise) asks the enthroned figure of High what other notable facts there are to know about Yggdrasil. High responds (Veðrfölnir is here anglicized as Vedrfolnir):

There is much to be told. An eagle sits at the top of the ash, and it has knowledge of many things. Between its eyes sits the hawk called Vedrfolnir [...]. The squirrel called Ratatosk runs up and down the ash. He tells slanderous gossip, provoking the eagle and Nidhogg.

== Theories ==
John Lindow points out that Snorri does not say why a hawk should be sitting between the eyes of an eagle or what role it may play. Lindow theorizes that "presumably the hawk is associated with the wisdom of the eagle" and that "perhaps, like Odin's ravens, it flies off acquiring and bringing back knowledge".

Hilda Ellis Davidson says that some Germanic peoples are attested as worshipping their deities in open forest clearings, and that a sky god was particularly connected with the oak tree, and therefore "a central tree was a natural symbol for them also".

== See also ==
- Hræsvelgr, a jötunn in the form of an eagle
- Víðópnir, the rooster that sits atop the tree Mímameiðr
