= Gangleri =

Gangleri may refer to:

- one of Odin's many nicknames meaning "the wanderer" or "Wayweary"
- the name of the ancient Swedish king Gylfi, given while in disguise, as described in the book Gylfaginning collected in the Prose Edda
- the name of the Icelandic magazine Gangleri, tímarit, an organ of the Theosophical Society in Iceland.
