= Yggdrasil =

Immense tree in Norse cosmology

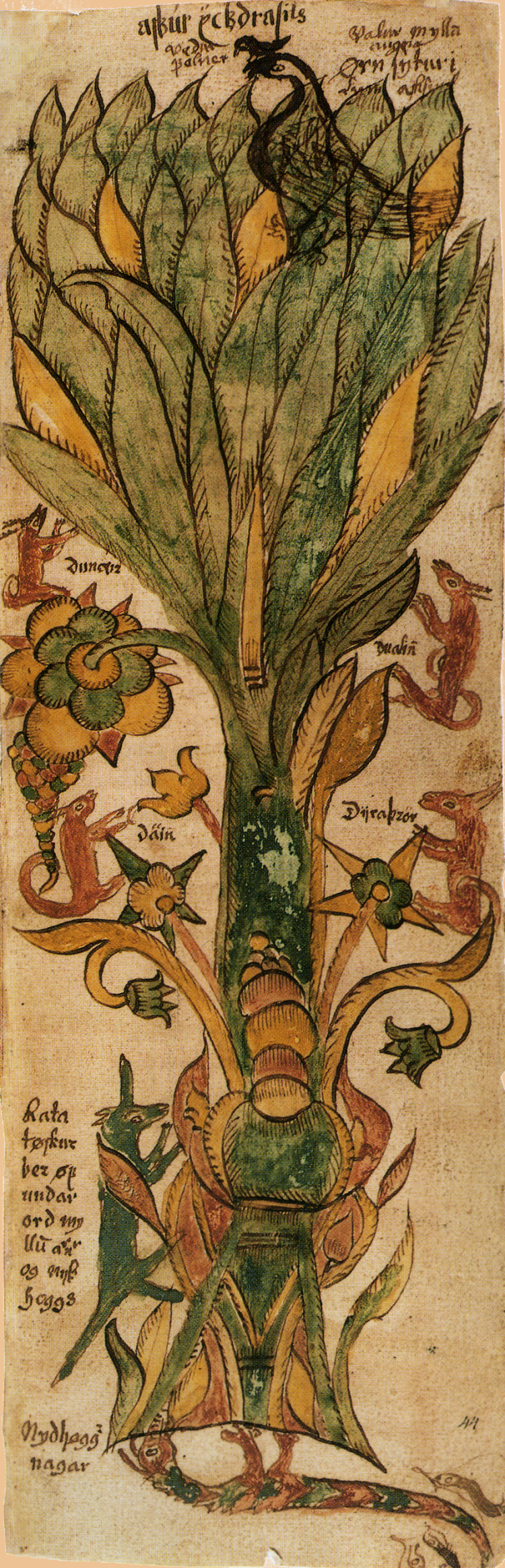
17th century depiction of Yggdrasil

Yggdrasil (from Old Norse Yggdrasill) is an immense and central sacred tree in Norse cosmology. Around it exists all else, including the Nine Worlds.

Yggdrasil is attested in the Poetic Edda compiled in the 13th century from earlier traditional sources, and in the Prose Edda compiled in the 13th century by Snorri Sturluson. In both sources, Yggdrasil is an immense ash tree that is central to the cosmos and considered very holy. The gods go to Yggdrasil daily to assemble at their traditional governing assemblies. The branches of Yggdrasil extend far into the heavens, and the tree is supported by three roots that extend far away into other locations; one to the well Urðarbrunnr in the heavens, one to the spring Hvergelmir, and another to the well Mímisbrunnr. Creatures live within Yggdrasil, including the dragon Níðhöggr, the squirrel Ratatoskr, the hawk Veðrfölnir, and the stags Dáinn, Dvalinn, Duneyrr and Duraþrór.

Scholars generally consider Hoddmímis holt, Mímameiðr, and Læraðr to be other names for the tree. The tree is an example of sacred trees and groves in Germanic paganism and mythology, and scholars in the field of Germanic philology have long discussed its implications.

== Etymology ==
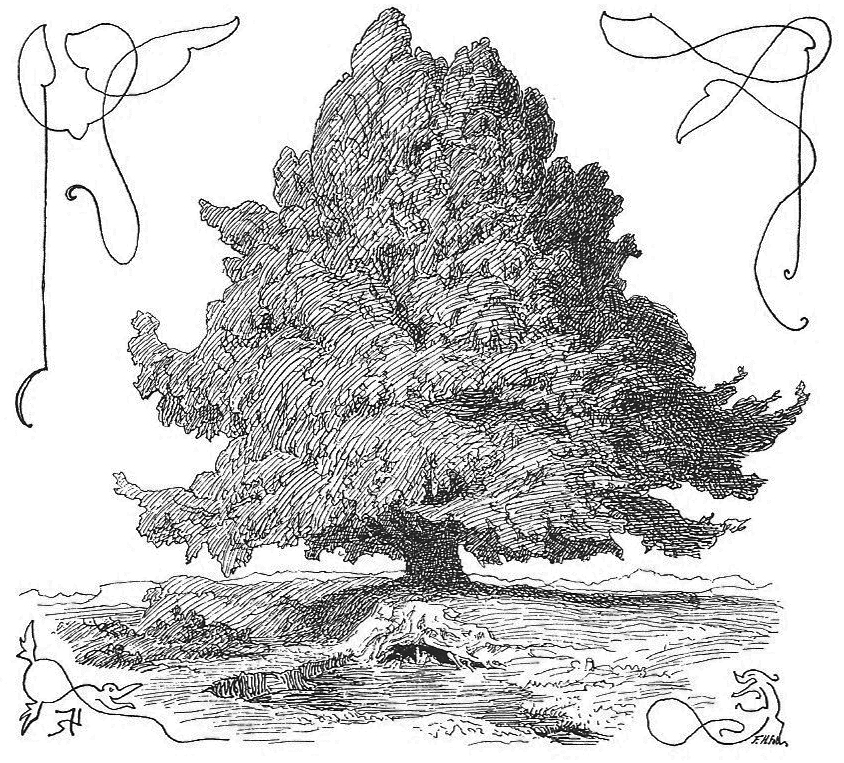
Yggdrasil (1895) by Lorenz Frølich

The generally accepted meaning of Old Norse Yggdrasill is "Odin's horse", meaning "gallows". This interpretation comes about because drasill means "horse" and Ygg(r) is one of Odin's many names. The Poetic Edda poem Hávamál describes how Odin sacrificed himself by hanging from a tree, making this tree Odin's gallows. This tree may have been Yggdrasil. "The horse of the hanged" is a kenning for gallows and therefore Odin's gallows may have developed into the expression "Odin's horse", which then became the name of the tree.

Nevertheless, scholarly opinions regarding the precise meaning of the name Yggdrasill vary, particularly on the issue of whether Yggdrasill is the name of the tree itself or if only the full term askr Yggdrasil (where Old Norse askr means "ash tree") refers specifically to the tree. According to this interpretation, askr Yggdrasils would mean the world tree upon which "the horse [Odin's horse] of the highest god [Odin] is bound". Both of these etymologies rely on a presumed but unattested *Yggsdrasill.

A third interpretation, presented by F. Detter, is that the name Yggdrasill refers to the word yggr ("terror"), yet not in reference to the Odinic name, and so Yggdrasill would then mean "tree of terror, gallows". F. R. Schröder has proposed a fourth etymology according to which yggdrasill means "yew pillar", deriving yggia from *igwja (meaning "yew-tree"), and drasill from *dher- (meaning "support").

Anatoly Liberman argues that the name Yggdrasill originally referred to Odin's literal horse (later known mainly as Sleipnir). He explains the missing 's' by suggesting that the original compound didn't mean 'Odin's horse' but 'Odin-horse'. The horse shared in the God's essence. This led to the kenning askr Yggdrasills, literally: 'the ash tree of Odin-horse', but by the conventions of Old Norse poetry: 'the warrior of Odin-horse', i.e. 'Odin'. Yggdrasill fell out of use as the name of Odin's horse, leaving the formula askr Yggdrasills obscure. It was reinterpreted to refer to the world tree, of which Liberman believes the Norse had some conception before the name 'Yggdrasill' was attached to it. Finally, askr Yggdrasills was simplified to askr Yggdrasill, i.e. from 'the ash tree of Yggdrasill' to 'the ash tree (called) Yggdrasill'.

== Attestations ==
=== Poetic Edda ===
In the Poetic Edda, the tree is mentioned in the three poems Völuspá, Hávamál and Grímnismál.

==== Völuspá ====
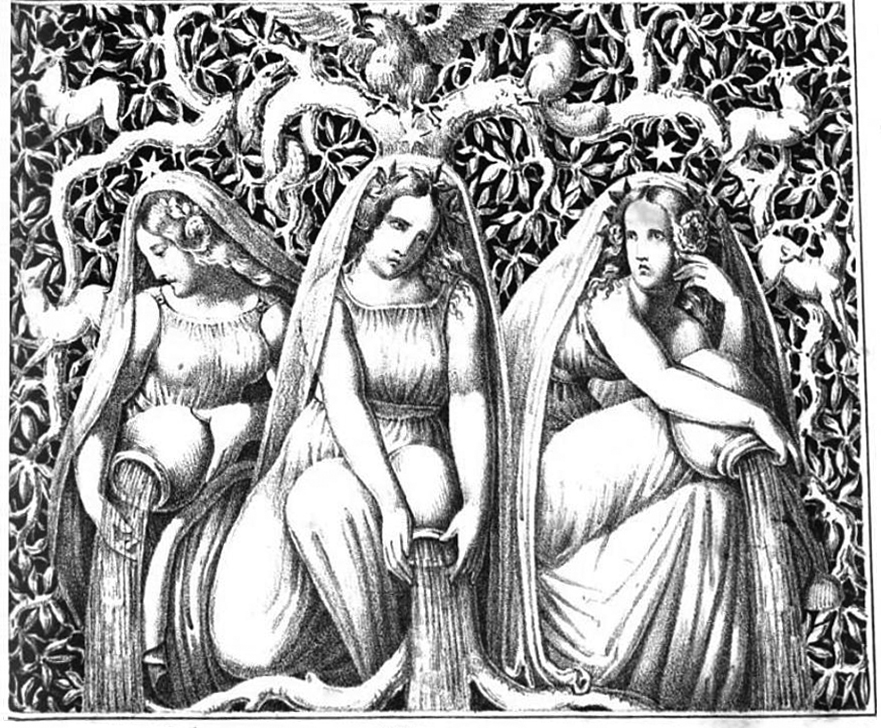
"Norns" (1832) from Die Helden und Götter des Nordens, oder das Buch der Sagen

In the second stanza of the Poetic Edda poem Völuspá, the völva (a shamanic seeress) reciting the poem to the god Odin says that she remembers far back to "early times", being raised by jötnar, recalls nine worlds and nine ídiðiur (rendered in a variety of ways by translators—Dronke, for example, provides "nine wood-ogresses"), and when Yggdrasil was a seed ("glorious tree of good measure, under the ground"). In stanza 19, the völva says:

An ash I know there stands,
Yggdrasill is its name,
a tall tree, showered
with shining loam.
From there come the dews
that drop in the valleys.
It stands forever green over
Urðr's well.

In stanza 20, the völva says that from the lake under the tree come three "maidens deep in knowledge" named Urðr, Verðandi, and Skuld. The maidens "incised the slip of wood", "laid down laws" and "chose lives" for the children of humanity and the destinies (ørlǫg) of men. In stanza 27, the völva details that she is aware that "Heimdallr's hearing is couched beneath the bright-nurtured holy tree." In stanza 45, Yggdrasil receives a final mention in the poem. The völva describes, as a part of the onset of Ragnarök, that Heimdallr blows Gjallarhorn, that Odin speaks with Mímir's head, and then:

Yggdrasill shivers,
the ash, as it stands.
The old tree groans,
and the giant slips free.

==== Hávamál ====
Odin sacrificing himself upon Yggdrasil (1895) by Lorenz Frølich

In stanza 138 of the poem Hávamál, Odin describes how he once sacrificed himself to himself by hanging on a tree. The stanza reads:

I know that I hung on a windy tree
nine long nights,
wounded with a spear, dedicated to Odin,
myself to myself,
on that tree of which no man knows
from where its roots run.

In the stanza that follows, Odin describes how he had no food nor drink there, that he peered downward, and that "I took up the runes, screaming I took them, then I fell back from there." Odin later used "the knowledge of the sacred runes" as a magical tool to give to humanity to increase humans' skill in magic and poetry.

While Yggdrasil is not mentioned by name in the poem and other trees exist in Norse mythology, the tree is near universally accepted as Yggdrasil by scholars, and if the tree is Yggdrasil, then the name Yggdrasil directly relates to this story.

==== Grímnismál ====
In the poem Grímnismál, Odin (disguised as Grímnir) provides the young Agnar with cosmological lore. Yggdrasil is first mentioned in the poem in stanza 29, where Odin says that, because the "bridge of the Æsir burns" and the "sacred waters boil," Thor must wade through the rivers Körmt and Örmt and two rivers named Kerlaugar to go "sit as judge at the ash of Yggdrasill". In the stanza that follows, a list of names of horses are given that the Æsir ride to "sit as judges" at Yggdrasil.

In stanza 31, Odin says that the ash Yggdrasil has three roots that grow in three directions. He details that beneath the first lives Hel, under the second live frost jötnar, and beneath the third lives humanity. Stanza 32 details that a squirrel named Ratatoskr must run across Yggdrasil and bring "the eagle's word" from above to Níðhöggr below. Stanza 33 describes that four harts named Dáinn, Dvalinn, Duneyrr and Duraþrór consume "the highest boughs" of Yggdrasil.

In stanza 34, Odin says that more serpents lie beneath Yggdrasil "than any fool can imagine" and lists them as Góinn and Móinn (possibly meaning Old Norse "land animal"), which he describes as sons of Grafvitnir (Old Norse, possibly "ditch wolf"), Grábakr (Old Norse "Greyback"), Grafvölluðr (Old Norse, possibly "the one digging under the plain" or possibly amended as "the one ruling in the ditch"), Ófnir (Old Norse "the winding one, the twisting one"), and Sváfnir (Old Norse, possibly "the one who puts to sleep = death"), who Odin adds that he thinks will forever gnaw on the tree's branches.

In stanza 35, Odin says that Yggdrasil "suffers agony more than men know", as a hart bites it from above, it decays on its sides, and Níðhöggr bites it from beneath. In stanza 44, Odin provides a list of things that are what he refers to as the "noblest" of their kind. Within the list, Odin mentions Yggdrasil first, and states that it is the "noblest of trees".

=== Prose Edda ===
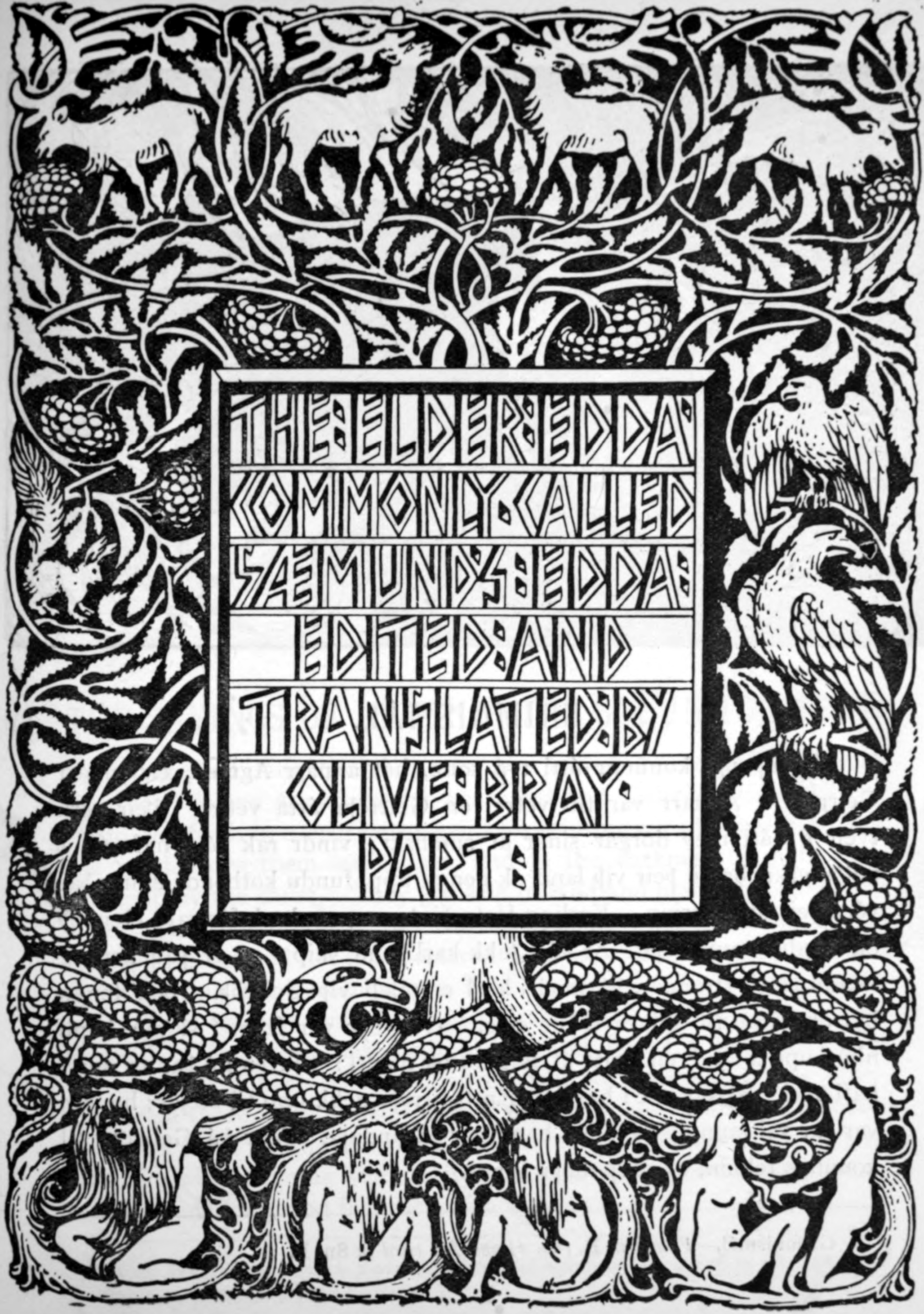
The title page of Olive Bray's 1908 translation of the Poetic Edda by W. G. Collingwood

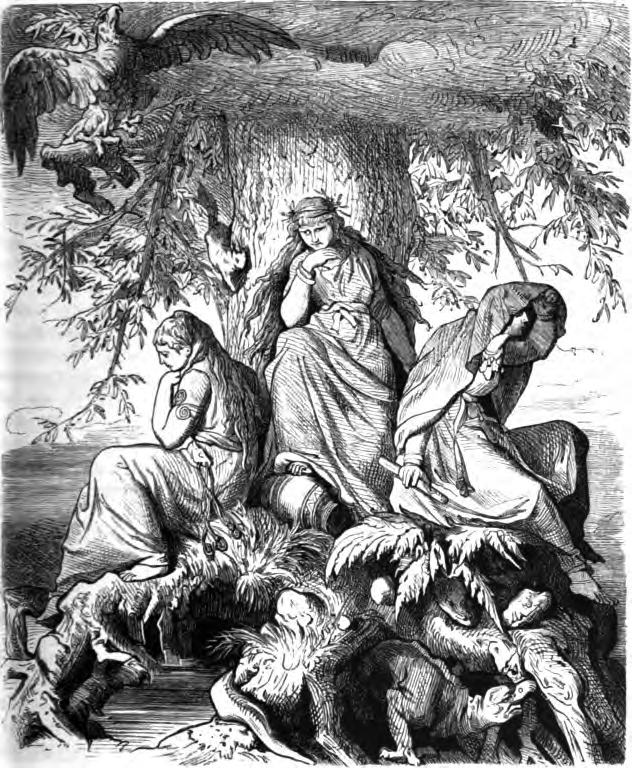
The norns Urðr, Verðandi, and Skuld beneath the world tree Yggdrasil (1882) by Ludwig Burger

Yggdrasil is mentioned in two books in the Prose Edda; Gylfaginning and Skáldskaparmál. In Gylfaginning, Yggdrasil is introduced in chapter 15. In chapter 15, Gangleri (described as king Gylfi in disguise) asks where is the chief or holiest place of the gods. High replies "It is the ash Yggdrasil. There the gods must hold their courts each day". Gangleri asks what there is to tell about Yggdrasil. Just-As-High says that Yggdrasil is the biggest and best of all trees, that its branches extend out over all of the world and reach out over the sky. Three of the roots of the tree support it, and these three roots also extend extremely far: one "is among the Æsir, the second among the frost jötnar, and the third over Niflheim. The root over Niflheim is gnawed at by the wyrm Níðhöggr, and beneath this root is the spring Hvergelmir. Beneath the root that reaches the frost jötnar is the well Mímisbrunnr, "which has wisdom and intelligence contained in it, and the master of the well is called Mimir". Just-As-High provides details regarding Mímisbrunnr and then describes that the third root of the well "extends to heaven" and that beneath the root is the "very holy" well Urðarbrunnr. At Urðarbrunnr the gods hold their court, and every day the Æsir ride to Urðarbrunnr up over the bridge Bifröst. Later in the chapter, a stanza from Grímnismál mentioning Yggdrasil is quoted in support.

In chapter 16, Gangleri asks "what other particularly notable things are there to tell about the ash?" High says there is quite a lot to tell about. High continues that an eagle sits on the branches of Yggdrasil and that it has much knowledge. Between the eyes of the eagle sits a hawk called Veðrfölnir. A squirrel called Ratatoskr scurries up and down the ash Yggdrasil carrying "malicious messages" between the eagle and Níðhöggr. Four stags named Dáinn, Dvalinn, Duneyrr, and Duraþrór run between the branches of Yggdrasil and consume its foliage. In the spring Hvergelmir are so many snakes along with Níðhöggr "that no tongue can enumerate them". Two stanzas from Grímnismál are then cited in support. High continues that the norns that live by the holy well Urðarbrunnr each day take water from the well and mud from around it and pour it over Yggdrasil so that the branches of the ash do not rot away or decay. High provides more information about Urðarbrunnr, cites a stanza from Völuspá in support, and adds that dew falls from Yggdrasil to the earth, explaining that "this is what people call honeydew, and from it bees feed".

In chapter 41, the stanza from Grímnismál is quoted that mentions that Yggdrasil is the foremost of trees. In chapter 54, as part of the events of Ragnarök, High describes that Odin will ride to the well Mímisbrunnr and consult Mímir on behalf of himself and his people. After this, "the ash Yggdrasil will shake and nothing will be unafraid in heaven or on earth", and then the Æsir and Einherjar will don their war gear and advance to the field of Vígríðr. Further into the chapter, the stanza in Völuspá that details this sequence is cited.

In the Prose Edda book Skáldskaparmál, Yggdrasil receives a single mention, though not by name. In chapter 64, names for kings and dukes are given. "Illustrious one" is provided as an example, appearing in a Christianity-influenced work by the skald Hallvarðr Háreksblesi: "There is not under the pole of the earth [Yggdrasil] an illustrious one closer to the lord of monks [God] than you."

== Theories ==
=== Shamanic origins ===
Hilda Ellis Davidson comments that the existence of nine worlds around Yggdrasil is mentioned more than once in Old Norse sources, but the identity of the worlds is never stated outright, though it can be deduced from various sources. Davidson comments that "no doubt the identity of the nine varied from time to time as the emphasis changed or new imagery arrived". Davidson says that it is unclear where the nine worlds are located in relation to the tree; they could either exist one above the other or perhaps be grouped around the tree, but there are references to worlds existing beneath the tree, while the gods are pictured as in the sky, a rainbow bridge (Bifröst) connecting the tree with other worlds. Davidson opines that "those who have tried to produce a convincing diagram of the Scandinavian cosmos from what we are told in the sources have only added to the confusion".

Davidson notes parallels between Yggdrasil and shamanic lore in northern Eurasia:

The conception of the tree rising through a number of worlds is found in northern Eurasia and forms part of the shamanic lore shared by many peoples of this region. This seems to be a very ancient conception, perhaps based on the Pole Star, the centre of the heavens, and the image of the central tree in Scandinavia may have been influenced by it.... Among Siberian shamans, a central tree may be used as a ladder to ascend the heavens.

Davidson says that the notion of an eagle atop a tree and the world serpent coiled around the roots of the tree has parallels in other cosmologies from Asia. She goes on to say that Norse cosmology may have been influenced by these Asiatic cosmologies from a northern location. Davidson adds, on the other hand, that it is attested that the Germanic peoples worshiped their deities in open forest clearings and that a sky god was particularly connected with the oak tree, and therefore "a central tree was a natural symbol for them also".

=== Mímameiðr, Hoddmímis holt, and Ragnarök ===
Lífþrasir and Líf after emerging from Hoddmímis holt (1895) by Lorenz Frølich

Connections have been proposed between the wood Hoddmímis holt (Old Norse "Hoard-Mímir's" holt) and the tree Mímameiðr ("Mímir's tree"), generally thought to refer to the world tree Yggdrasil, and the spring Mímisbrunnr. John Lindow concurs that Mímameiðr may be another name for Yggdrasil and that if the Hoard-Mímir of the name Hoddmímis holt is the same figure as Mímir (associated with the spring named after him, Mímisbrunnr), then the Mímir's holt—Yggdrasil—and Mímir's spring may be within the same proximity.

Carolyne Larrington notes that it is nowhere expressly stated what will happen to Yggdrasil during the events of Ragnarök. Larrington points to a connection between the primordial figure of Mímir and Yggdrasil in the poem Völuspá, and theorizes that "it is possible that Hoddmimir is another name for Mimir, and that the two survivors hide in Yggdrasill."

Rudolf Simek theorizes that the survival of Líf and Lífþrasir through Ragnarök by hiding in Hoddmímis holt is "a case of reduplication of the anthropogeny, understandable from the cyclic nature of the Eddic eschatology". Simek says that Hoddmímis holt "should not be understood literally as a wood or even a forest in which the two keep themselves hidden, but rather as an alternative name for the world tree Yggdrasill. Thus, the creation of humanity from tree trunks (Askr, Embla) is repeated after the Ragnarök as well." Simek says that in Germanic regions, the concept of humanity originating from trees is ancient. Simek additionally points out legendary parallels in a Bavarian legend of a shepherd who lives inside a tree, whose descendants repopulate the land after life there has been wiped out by plague (citing a retelling by F. R. Schröder). In addition, Simek points to an Old Norse parallel in the figure of Örvar-Oddr, "who is rejuvenated after living as a tree-man (Ǫrvar-Odds saga 24–27)".

=== Warden trees, Irminsul, and sacred trees ===
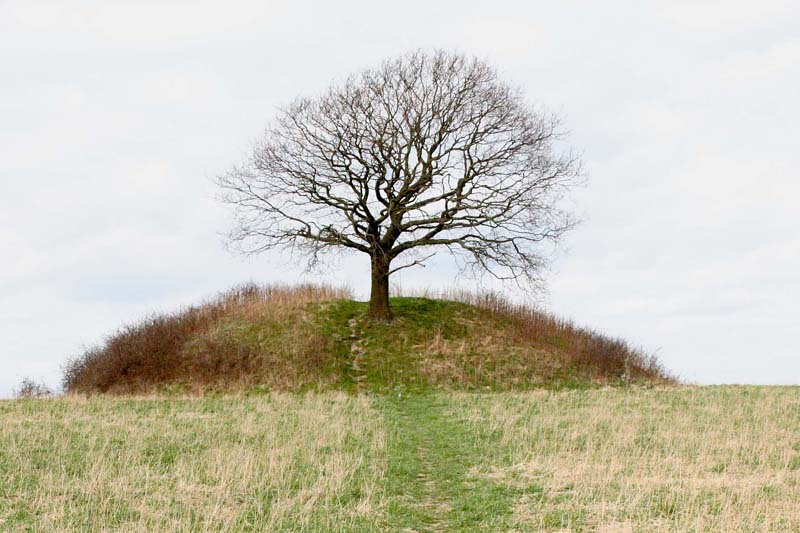
A tree grows atop Mysselhøj, a Nordic Bronze Age burial mound in Roskilde, Denmark

Continuing as late as the 19th century, warden trees were venerated in areas of Germany and Scandinavia, considered to be guardians and bringers of luck, and offerings were sometimes made to them. A massive birch tree standing atop a burial mound and located beside a farm in western Norway is recorded as having had ale poured over its roots during festivals. The tree was felled in 1874.

Davidson comments that "the position of the tree in the centre as a source of luck and protection for gods and men is confirmed" by these rituals to Warden Trees. Davidson notes that the gods are described as meeting beneath Yggdrasil to hold their things, and the related Irminsul, which may have been a pillar, was also symbolic of the center of the world. Davidson details that it would be difficult to ascertain whether a tree or pillar came first, and that this is likely to depend on whether the holy location was in a thickly wooded area or not. Davidson notes that there is no mention of a sacred tree at Þingvellir in Iceland, but that Adam of Bremen describes a huge tree standing next to the Temple at Uppsala in Sweden, which remained green throughout summer and winter, and that no one knew what type it was. Davidson comments that while it is uncertain if Adam's informant actually witnessed the tree, the existence of sacred trees in pre-Christian Germanic Europe is further evidenced by records of their destruction by early Christian missionaries, such as Thor's Oak by Saint Boniface.

Ken Dowden comments that behind Irminsul, Thor's Oak in Geismar, and the sacred tree at Uppsala "looms a mythic prototype, an Yggdrasil, the world-ash of the Norsemen".

== Modern influence ==
Thomas Carlyle adopted "Igdrasil" as a favorite symbol; it features in both On Heroes, Hero-Worship, & the Heroic in History (1841) and Past and Present (1843). John Ruskin referenced it in the conclusion to The Laws of Fésole (1877–1878). An unpublished manuscript of Carlyle's entitled "Igdrasil. From the Norse" inspired the editor of The Ruskin Reading Guild Journal to add Igdrasil to its name in 1890.

Modern works of art depicting Yggdrasil include Die Nornen (painting, 1888) by K. Ehrenberg; Yggdrasil (fresco, 1933) by Axel Revold, located in the University of Oslo library auditorium in Oslo, Norway; Hjortene beiter i løvet på Yggdrasil asken (wood relief carving, 1938) on the Oslo City Hall by Dagfin Werenskiold; and the bronze relief on the doors of the Swedish Museum of National Antiquities (around 1950) by B. Marklund in Stockholm, Sweden.

Poems mentioning Yggdrasil include Vårdträdet by Viktor Rydberg and Yggdrasill by J. Linke.

In Overlord, a Japanese light novel series written by Kugane Maruyama, Yggdrasil is the name of a popular DMMORPG, where the protagonist got trapped after its shutdown.

Yggdrasil is a common motif in Marvel Cinematic Universe media, appearing in Thor, Captain America: The First Avenger, Thor: The Dark World, Loki, and Avengers: Doomsday.

== See also ==
- Axis mundi, mythological concept representing "the connection between the higher and lower realms"
- Yggdrasil Linux/GNU/X
