= Mímisbrunnr =

Spring in Nordic mythology

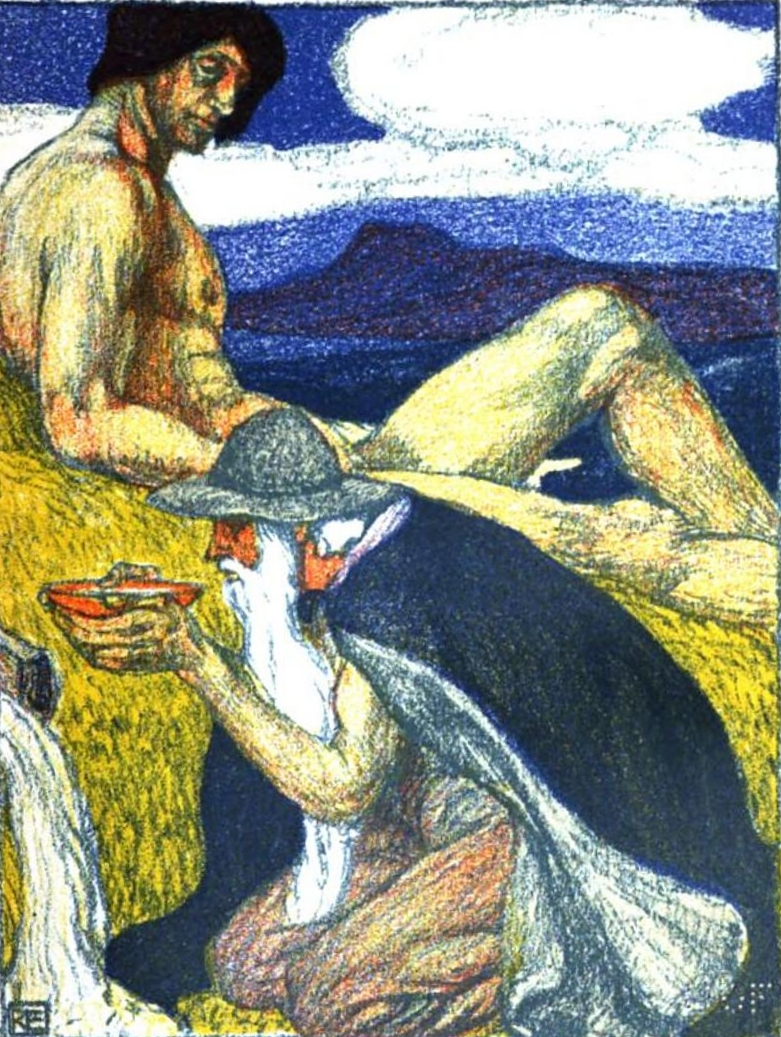
Odin drinks from Mímisbrunnr as Mímir looks on (1903) in a work by Robert Engels

In Norse mythology, Mímisbrunnr (Old Norse "Mímir's wellspring") is a spring or well associated with the being Mímir, located beneath the world tree Yggdrasil. Mímisbrunnr is attested in the Poetic Edda, compiled in the 13th century from earlier traditional sources, and the Prose Edda, written in the 13th century by Snorri Sturluson. The wellspring is located beneath one of three roots of the world tree Yggdrasil, a root that passes into the Jötunheimr where the primordial plane of Ginnungagap once existed. In addition, the Prose Edda relates that the water of the wellspring contains much wisdom, and that Odin sacrificed one of his eyes to the wellspring in exchange for a drink. In the Prose Edda, Mímisbrunnr is mentioned as one of three wellsprings existing beneath three roots of Yggdrasil, the other two being Hvergelmir, located beneath a root in Niflheim, and Urðarbrunnr.

== Attestations ==
=== Poetic Edda ===
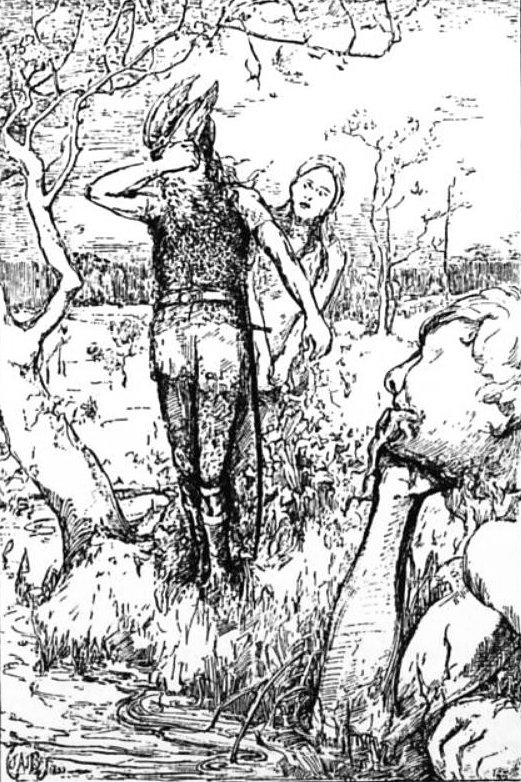
"Odin at the Brook Mimir" (1893) by John Angell James Brindley

In the Poetic Edda poem Völuspá, a völva recounts to Odin that she knows that Odin once placed one of his eyes in Mímisbrunnr as a pledge, and that Mímir drinks from the wellspring every morning:

| Benjamin Thorpe translation: "Of what wouldst thou ask me? Why temptest thou me? Odin! I know all, where thou thine eye didst sink in the pure well of Mim." Mim drinks from mead each morn from Valfather's pledge. | Henry Adams Bellows translation: I know where Othin's eye is hidden, Deep in the wide-famed well of Mimir; Mead from the pledge of Othin each morn Does Mimir drink: would you know yet more? |

The above stanza is absent from the Hauksbók manuscript version of the poem. Elsewhere in the poem, the völva mentions a scenario involving the hearing or horn (depending on translation of the Old Norse noun hljóð—bolded for the purpose of illustration) of the god Heimdallr:

| Benjamin Thorpe translation: She knows that **Heimdall's horn** is hidden under the heaven-bright holy tree. A river she sees flow, with foamy fall, from Valfather's pledge. Understand ye yet, or what? | Henry Adams Bellows translation: I know of the **horn of Heimdall**, hidden Under the high-reaching holy tree; On it there pours from Valfather's pledge A mighty stream: would you know yet more? | Carolyne Larrington translation: She knows that **Heimdall's hearing** is hidden under the radiant, sacred tree; she sees, pouring down, the muddy torrent from the wager of Father of the Slain; do you understand yet, or what more? |

Scholar Paul Schach comments that the stanzas in this section of Voluspa are "all very mysterious and obscure, as it was perhaps meant to be". Schach details that "Heimdallar hljóð has aroused much speculation. Snorri seems to have confused this word with gjallarhorn, but there is otherwise no attestation of the use of hljóð in the sense of 'horn' in Icelandic. Various scholars have read this as "hearing" rather than "horn".

Scholar Carolyne Larrington comments that if "hearing" rather than "horn" is understood to appear in this stanza, the stanza indicates that Heimdall, like Odin, has left a body part in the well; his ear. Larrington says that "Odin exchanged one of his eyes for wisdom from Mimir, guardian of the well, while Heimdall seems to have forfeited his ear."

=== Prose Edda ===
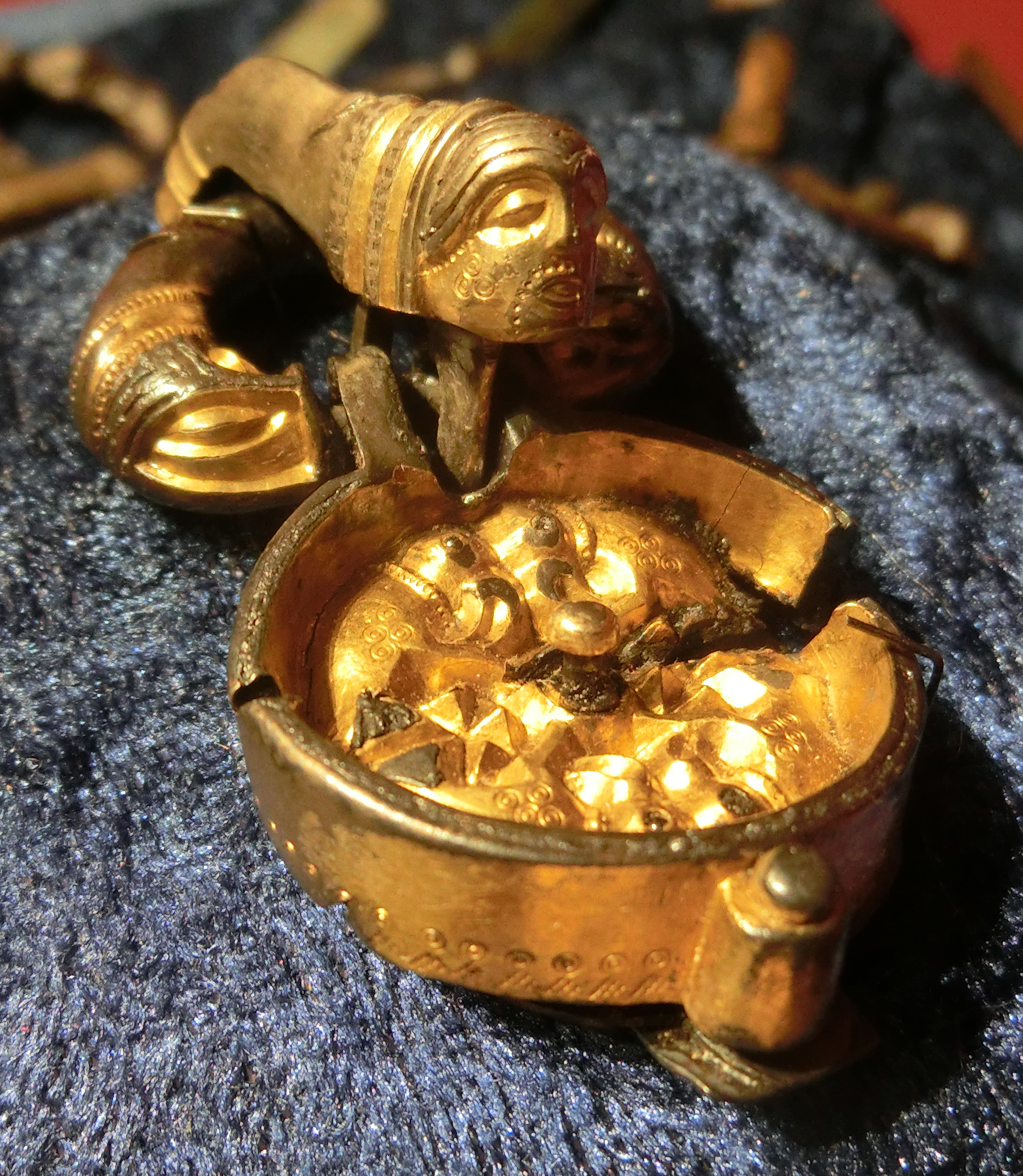
The archaeologist Bengt Nordqvist interprets this belt buckle found at Finnestorp as a depiction of Odin at Mímisbrunnr.

In chapter 15 of the Prose Edda book Gylfaginning, the enthroned figure High tells Gangleri (described as king Gylfi in disguise) about Yggdrasil. High details that Yggdrasil has three roots. One of these roots reaches to where the primordial space of Ginnungagap once existed and where now the frost jötnar live. High explains that, beneath this root is Mímisbrunnr and that the well contains "wisdom and intelligence" and "the master of the well is called Mimir. He is full of learning because he drinks of the well from the horn Giallarhorn. All-father went there and asked for a single drink from the well, but he did not get one until he placed his eye as a pledge." After his explanation, High quotes the stanza involving Odin and the well from Völuspá.

== See also ==
- Hoddmímis holt, a holt associated with Mímir
- Hvergelmir
- Urðarbrunnr
- Wetlands and islands in Germanic paganism
