= Fimbulwinter =

Norse mythological event preceding Ragnarök

A gold foil figure of the type offered in large numbers during the volcanic winter of 536.

Fimbulwinter (Old Norse: Fimbulvetr, lit. 'mighty winter') is the immediate prelude to the events of Ragnarök in Norse mythology.

== Etymology ==
The Old Norse term Fimbulvetr means "awful, mighty winter". The prefix fimbul-, albeit with a largely unknown etymology, means "mighty, giant" etc., so the literal interpretation is "mighty winter".

== Overview ==
Fimbulwinter is the harsh winter that precedes the end of the world. Fimbulwinter is three successive winters, when snow comes in from all directions, without any intervening summer. Innumerable wars follow.

The event is described primarily in the Poetic Edda. In the poem Vafþrúðnismál, Odin poses the question to Vafþrúðnir as to who of mankind will survive the Fimbulwinter. Vafþrúðnir responds that Líf and Lífþrasir will survive and that they will live in the forest of Hoddmímis holt.

The mythology might be related to the volcanic winter of 536, which resulted in a notable drop in temperature across northern Europe. The event has become known as the fimbulwinter of 536 in Sweden (fimbulvintern 536). There have also been several popular ideas about whether the particular piece of mythology has a connection to the climate change that occurred in the Nordic countries at the end of the Nordic Bronze Age from about 650 BC.

In Denmark, Norway, Sweden, and other Nordic countries, the term Fimbulvetr still refers to an unusually cold and harsh winter.

== See also ==
- Eschatology
- Laki 1783 eruption
- Nuclear winter
- Ragnarök
- Volcanic winter
