= Mímameiðr =

Mythological tree

In Norse mythology, Mímameiðr (Old Norse "Mimi's tree") is a tree whose branches stretch over every land, is unharmed by fire or metal, bears fruit that assists pregnant women, and upon whose highest bough roosts the cock Víðópnir. Mímameiðr is solely attested in the Old Norse poem Fjölsvinnsmál. Due to parallels between descriptions of the two, scholars generally consider Mímameiðr to be another name for the world tree Yggdrasil, along with the similarly named Hoddmímis holt, a wood within which Líf and Lífthrasir are foretold to take refuge during the events of Ragnarök. Mímameiðr is sometimes modernly anglicized as Mimameid or Mimameith.

== Fjölsvinnsmál ==
Mímameiðr is mentioned in stanzas of the eddic-meter poem Fjölsvinnsmál, where the tree is described as having limbs that stretch over every land, bearing helpful fruit, and as harboring the cock Víðópnir. The first mention occurs when Svipdagr asks Fjölsviðr to tell him what the name of the tree whose branches reach over every land. Fjolsvith responds that:

Benjamin Thorpe translation: Mimameidir it is called; but few men know from what roots it springs: it by that will fall which fewest know. Nore fire nor iron will harm it.	Henry Adams Bellows translation: "Mimameith its name, and no man knows What root beneath it runs; And few can guess what shall fell the tree, For fire nor iron shall fell it."

This stanza is followed by another where Svipdagr asks Fjölsviðr what grows from the seed of the tree. Fjölsviðr responds that fruit grows from the tree:

Benjamin Thorpe translation: Its fruit shall on the fire be laid, for labouring women; out then will pass what would in remain: so is it a creator of mankind."	Henry Adams Bellows translation: "Women, sick with child shall seek Its fruit to the flames to bear; Then out shall come what within was hid, And so is it mighty with men."

In the notes to his translation of this stanza, Bellows comments this stanza is to be understood as explaining that, when cooked, the fruit of Mímameiðr—which he identifies as Yggdrasil—will assure safe childbirth.

A third mention occurs when Svipdagr tells Fjölsviðr to tell him what the name of the glittering, golden cock is that sits "on the highest bough". Fjölsviðr complies, revealing that the cock is named Víðópnir:

Benjamin Thorpe translation: "Vidofnir he is called; in the clear air he stands, in the boughs of Mima's tree: affliction only brings, together indissoluble, the swart bird at his lonely meal."	Henry Adams Bellows translation: "Vithofnir his name, and now he shines Like lightning on Mimameith's limbs; And great is the trouble with which he grieves Both Surt and Sinmora."

== Theories ==
Scholar Rudolf Simek connects Mímameiðr with Mímisbrunnr ("Mímir's well"), which is located beneath one of the three roots of the cosmological tree Yggdrasil. Simek concludes that due to the location of the well, Mímameiðr is potentially another name for Yggdrasil. In addition, Simek says that Hoddmímis holt ("Hoard-Mímir's" holt)—a wood whose name refers to the same figure and wherein Líf and Lífþrasir survive Ragnarök—may also be another name for Yggdrasil, and therefore is likely the same location as Mímameiðr.

Scholar John Lindow concurs, noting that if the figures within the location names are the same, then the identification of all the locations as within close vicinity is likely.
