= Líf and Lífþrasir =

Parents of humankind in Norse mythology

In Norse mythology, Líf (identical with the Old Norse noun meaning "life, the life of the body") and Lífþrasir (Old Norse masculine name from líf and þrasir and defined by Lexicon Poëticum as "Livæ amator, vitæ amans, vitæ cupidus" "Líf's lover, lover of life, zest for life"), sometimes anglicized as Lif and Lifthrasir, female and male respectively, are two humans who are foretold to survive the events of Ragnarök by hiding in a wood called Hoddmímis holt and, after the flames have abated, to repopulate the newly risen and fertile world. Líf and Lífþrasir are mentioned in the Poetic Edda, which was compiled in the 13th century from earlier traditional sources, and the Prose Edda, written in the 13th century by Snorri Sturluson. Many scholars have speculated as to the underlying meaning and origins of both names.

== Attestations ==
In the poem Vafþrúðnismál, collected in the Poetic Edda, the god Odin poses a question to the jötunn Vafþrúðnir, asking who among humankind will survive when Fimbulvetr, the winter at the end of the world, occurs. Vafþrúðnir responds that they will be Líf and Lífþrasir, that the two will have hidden in the wood of Hoddmímis Holt, they will consume the morning dew as food, and "from them generations will spring".

In chapter 53 of the Prose Edda book Gylfaginning, High tells Gangleri (king Gylfi in disguise) that two people, Líf and Lífþrasir, will lie hid in Hoddmímis Holt during "Surt's fire", and that "from these people there will be descended such a great progeny that the world will be inhabited." The above-mentioned stanza of Vafþrúðnismál is then quoted.

== Reception ==
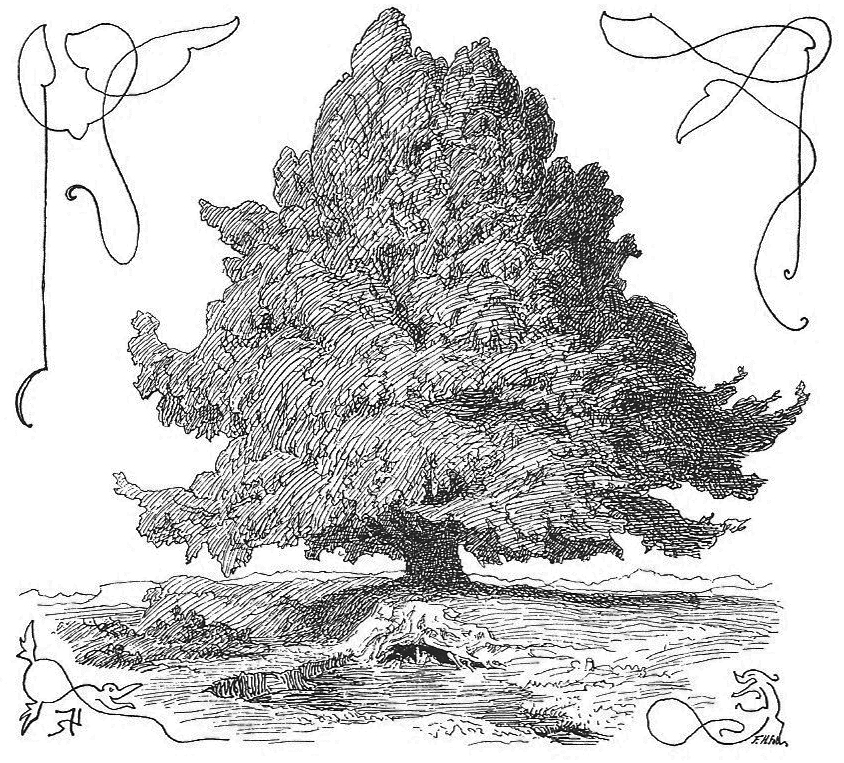
The world tree Yggdrasil. At the foot of the tree is a well, which is presumably Urðarbrunnr. No caption or title provided in the work, but the illustration appears in a section of Grímnismál labeled "Om Yggdrasil" (Danish: "about [or around, depending on context] Yggdrasil").

Carolyne Larrington notes that it is nowhere expressly stated what will happen to the world tree Yggdrasil at Ragnarök, points to a connection between Mímir and Yggdrasil in the poem Völuspá, and theorizes that "it is possible that Hoddmimir is another name for Mimir, and that the two survivors hide in Yggdrasill."

Rudolf Simek theorizes that the survival of Líf and Lífþrasir is "a case of reduplication of the anthropogeny, understandable from the cyclic nature of the Eddic eschatology." Simek says that Hoddmímis holt "should not be understood literally as a wood or even a forest in which the two keep themselves hidden, but rather as an alternative name for the world-tree Yggdrasil. Thus, the creation of mankind from tree trunks (Askr, Embla) is repeated after the Ragnarǫk as well." Simek says that in Germanic regions, the concept of humankind originating from trees is ancient. Simek additionally points out legendary parallels in a Bavarian legend of a shepherd who lives inside a tree, whose descendants repopulate the land after life there has been wiped out by plague (citing a retelling by F. R. Schröder). In addition, Simek points to an Old Norse parallel in the figure of Örvar-Oddr, "who is rejuvenated after living as a tree-man (Ǫrvar-Odds saga 24–27)".

== See also ==
- Ask and Embla, the first two humans in Norse mythology
