= Hoddmímis holt =

Mythological forest

In Norse mythology, Hoddmímis holt (Old Norse "Hoard-Mímir's" holt) is a location where Líf and Lífþrasir are foretold to survive the long winters of Fimbulvetr. Hoddmímis holt is attested in the Poetic Edda, compiled in the 13th century from earlier traditional sources, and the Prose Edda, written in the 13th century by Snorri Sturluson. Like the very similarly named Mímameiðr, scholars generally consider Hoddmímis holt to be another name for Yggdrasil and connect it to folklore recorded from continental Germanic folklore.

== Attestations ==
In the poem Vafþrúðnismál, collected in the Poetic Edda, the god Odin poses a question to the jötunn Vafþrúðnir, asking who among mankind will survive when the winter Fimbulvetr occurs. Vafþrúðnir responds that they will be Líf and Lífþrasir, that the two will have hidden in the wood of Hoddmímis holt, they will consume the morning dew as food, and "from them generations will spring."

In chapter 53 of the Prose Edda book Gylfaginning, High tells Gangleri (king Gylfi in disguise) that two people, Líf and Lífþrasir, will lie hid in Hoddmímis holt during "Surt's fire," and that "from these people there will be descended such a great progeny that the world will be inhabited." The above-mentioned stanza of Vafþrúðnismál is then quoted.

== Theories ==
Connections have been proposed between the forest and Mímameiðr ("Mímir's tree"), generally thought to refer to the world tree Yggdrasil, and Mímisbrunnr. Based on this association, all three have been theorized as either being the same entity, or as having been visualized within the same proximity. For example, Carolyne Larrington, who notes that it is nowhere expressly stated what will happen to the world tree Yggdrasil at Ragnarök, points to a connection between Mímir and Yggdrasil in the poem Völuspá, and theorizes that "it is possible that Hoddmimir is another name for Mimir, and that the two survivors hide in Yggdrasill."

Rudolf Simek theorizes that the survival of Líf and Lífþrasir is "a case of reduplication of the anthropogeny, understandable from the cyclic nature of the Eddic eschatology." Simek says that Hoddmímis holt "should not be understood literally as a wood or even a forest in which the two keep themselves hidden, but rather as an alternative name for the world-tree Yggdrasill. Thus, the creation of mankind from tree trunks (Askr, Embla) is repeated after the Ragnarǫk as well." Simek says that in Germanic regions, the concept of mankind originating from trees is ancient. Simek additionally points out legendary parallels in a Bavarian legend of a shepherd who lives inside a tree, whose descendants repopulate the land after life there has been wiped out by plague (citing a retelling by F. R. Schröder). In addition, Simek points to an Old Norse parallel in the figure of Örvar-Oddr, "who is rejuvenated after living as a tree-man (Ǫrvar-Odds saga 24–27)."
