= Mímir =

Norse god of wisdom

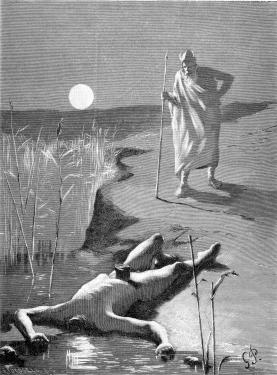
A 19th century depiction of Odin finding Mímir's beheaded body (Poetic Edda by Erik Brate)

Mímir or Mim is a figure in Norse mythology, renowned for his knowledge and wisdom, who is beheaded during the Æsir–Vanir War. Afterward, the god Odin carries around Mímir's head and it recites secret knowledge and counsels him.

Mímir is attested in the Poetic Edda, compiled in the 13th century from earlier traditional sources, the Prose Edda, written in the 13th century by Snorri Sturluson of Iceland, and in euhemerized form as one of the Æsir in Heimskringla, also written by Snorri Sturluson in the 13th century. Mímir's name appears in the names of the well Mímisbrunnr, and the names Mímameiðr and Hoddmímis holt, which scholars generally consider to be names for Yggdrasil. Scholars have proposed that Bestla may be Mímir's sister, and therefore Mímir would be Odin's maternal uncle.

== Etymology ==
The proper names Mímir and Mim present difficulties for historical linguists. However, the most generally accepted etymology among philologists is that Mímir stems from a reduplication of the Proto-Indo-European verb *(s)mer-, meaning 'to think, recall, reflect, worry over' (compare Sanskrit smárati, Avestan hi-šmaraiti, Ancient Greek mermaírō, Gothic maúrnan).

In turn, scholars note that the names Mímir and Mim are therefore likely ultimately to be related to the modern English word 'memory' and its associated concepts. For example, scholar Rudolf Simek renders the name as meaning 'the rememberer, the wise one'.

== Attestations ==
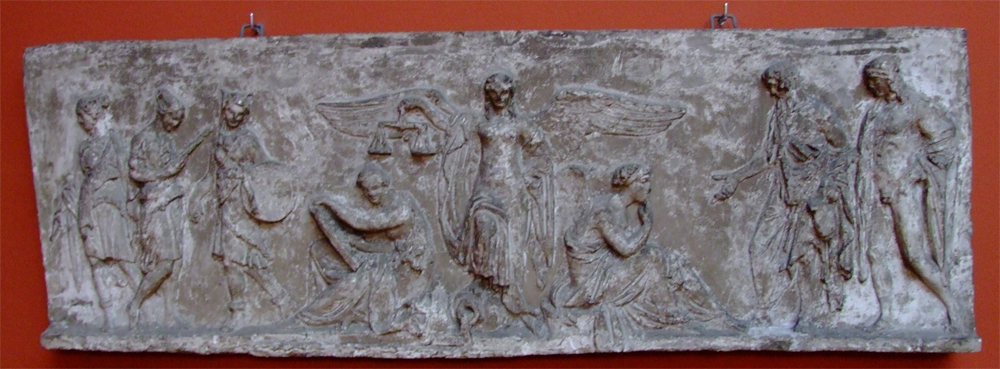
"Mímer and Balder Consulting the Norns" (1821–1822) by H. E. Freund

=== Poetic Edda ===
Mímir is mentioned in the Poetic Edda poems Völuspá and Sigrdrífumál. In Völuspá, Mímir is mentioned in two stanzas. Stanza 28 references Odin's sacrifice of his eye to Mímir's Well, and states that Mímir drinks mead every morning "from the Father of the Slain's [Odin] wager." Stanza 46 describes that, in reference to Ragnarök, the "sons" of Mím are at play while "fate burns" (though no further information about these "sons" has survived), that the god Heimdallr blows the Gjallarhorn, and that Mímir's severed head gives counsel to Odin. The single mention in stanza 14 of Sigrdrífumál is also a reference to Mímir's speaking, decollated head. Stanzas 20 and 24 of the poem Fjölsvinnsmál refer to Yggdrasil as Mímameiðr.

=== Prose Edda ===
In chapter 15 of the Prose Edda book Gylfaginning, as owner of his namesake well, Mímir himself drinks from it and gains great knowledge. To drink from the well, he uses the Gjallarhorn, a drinking horn which shares its name with the sounding horn used by Heimdallr intended to announce the onset of Ragnarök. The section further relates that the well is located beneath one of the three roots of Yggdrasil, in the realm of the frost jötnar.

Chapter 51 relates that, with the onset of Ragnarök, "Heimdall stands up and blows the Gjallarhorn with all his strength. He wakens all the gods who then hold an assembly. Odin now rides to Mimir's Well, seeking council for both himself and his followers. The ash Yggdrasil shakes, and nothing, whether in heaven or on earth, is without fear."

In the Prose Edda book Skáldskaparmál, Mímir's name appears in various kennings. These kennings include "Mím's friend" (for "Odin") in three places, "mischief-Mímir" (a kenning for "jötunn"), and among a list of names for jötunn.

=== Heimskringla ===
Mímir is mentioned in chapters 4 and 7 of the saga Ynglinga Saga, as collected in Heimskringla. In chapter 4, Snorri presents a euhemerized account of the Æsir-Vanir War. Snorri states that the two sides eventually tired of the war and both agree to meet to establish a truce. The two sides meet and exchanged hostages. Vanaheimr are described as having sent to Asgard their best men: Njörðr—described as wealthy—and his son Freyr in exchange for Asaland's Hœnir—described here as large, handsome, and thought of by the people of Vanaheimr well suited to be a chieftain. Additionally, the Æsir send Mímir—described as a man of great understanding—in exchange for Kvasir, who Snorri describes as the wisest man of Vanaheimr.

Snorri continues that, upon arrival in Vanaheimr, Hœnir was immediately made chief and Mímir often gave him good counsel. However, when Hœnir was at meetings and at the Thing without Mímir by his side, he would always answer the same way: "Let others decide." Subsequently, the Vanir suspected they had been cheated in the exchange by the Æsir, so they seized Mimir and beheaded him and sent the head to Asgard. Odin took the head of Mímir, embalmed it with herbs so that it would not rot, and spoke charms over it, which gave it the power to speak to him and reveal to him secrets. The head of Mímir is again mentioned in chapter 7 in connection with Odin, where Odin is described as keeping Mímir's head with him and that it divulged information from other worlds.

== Theories ==
On the basis of Hávamál 140 – where Odin learns nine magic songs from the unnamed brother of his mother Bestla – some scholars have theorized that Bestla's brother may in fact be Mímir, who would then be Odin's maternal uncle. This also means that Mimir's father would be Bölþorn.

In the theories of Viktor Rydberg, Mímir's wife is Sinmara, named in the poem Fjölsvinnsmal. According to Rydberg, the byname Sinmara ("sinew-maimir") refers to "Mímir-Niðhad"'s "queen ordering Völund's hamstrings to be cut".

== In popular culture ==
Mímir features in Santa Monica Studio's 2018 action-adventure video game God of War and its 2022 sequel God of War Ragnarök. He is voiced by Scottish actor Alastair Duncan in both entries.

== See also ==
- Mimir (sculpture), a 1980 bronze and concrete sculpture in Portland, Oregon
- Nine Herbs Charm, an Anglo-Saxon charm featuring Woden and herbs.
- Brazen head

== Sources ==
- The Prose Edda. Translated by Byock, Jesse. Penguin Classics. 2006. ISBN 0-14-044755-5.
- Edda. Translated by Faulkes, Anthony. Everyman's Library. 1995. ISBN 0-460-87616-3.
- The Poetic Edda. Translated by Larrington, Carolyne. Oxford World's Classics. 1999. ISBN 0-19-283946-2.
- Hollander, Lee M. (trans.), ed. (2007). Heimskringla: History of the Kings of Norway. University of Texas Press. ISBN 978-0-292-73061-8. Archived from the original on 23 April 2023.
- Lincoln, Bruce (1991). Death, War, and Sacrifice: Studies in ideology & practice. University of Chicago Press. ISBN 9780226482002.
- Simek, Rudolf (2007). Dictionary of Northern Mythology. Translated by Hall, Angela. D.S. Brewer. ISBN 978-0-85991-513-7.
