= Gylfi =

Earliest recorded king in Scandinavia according to Norse mythology

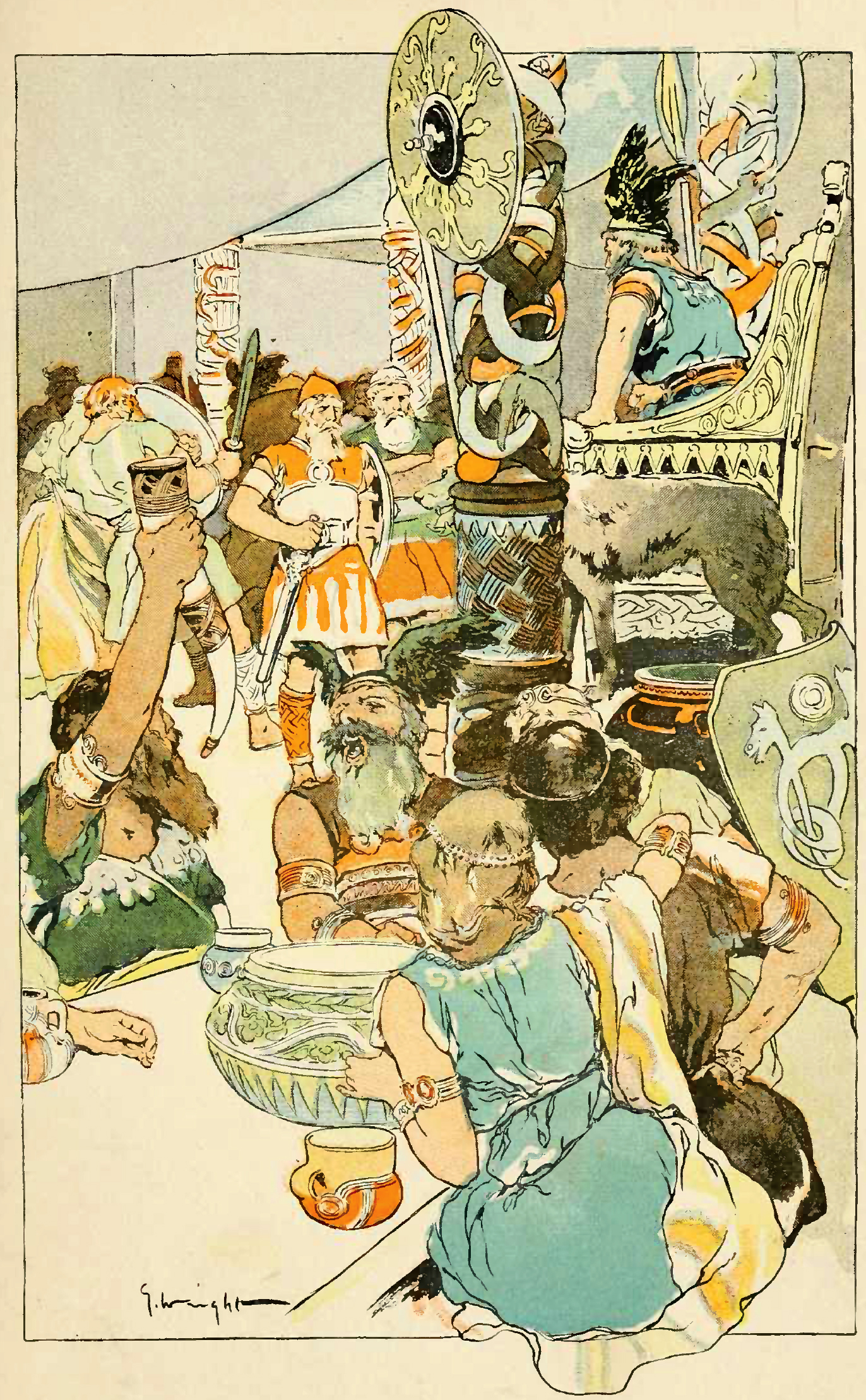
Gylfe Stood Boldly Before Odin (1908) by George Hand Wright.

In Norse mythology, Gylfi (Old Norse: [ˈɡylve]), Gylfe, Gylvi, or Gylve was the earliest recorded king of Sviþjoð, Sweden, in Scandinavia. He is known by the name Gangleri when appearing in disguise. The Danish tradition on Gylfi tells how he was tricked by Gefjon and her sons from Jötunheim, who were able to shapeshift into tremendous oxen.

== The creation of Zealand ==
The Ynglinga saga section of Snorri's Heimskringla and the Eddic poem Ragnarsdrápa tell a legend of how Gylfi was seduced by the goddess Gefjon to give her as much land as she could plow in one night. Gefjon transformed her four sons into oxen and took enough land to create the Danish island of Zealand, leaving the Swedish lake Mälaren or Vänern.

== Meeting the Æsir ==
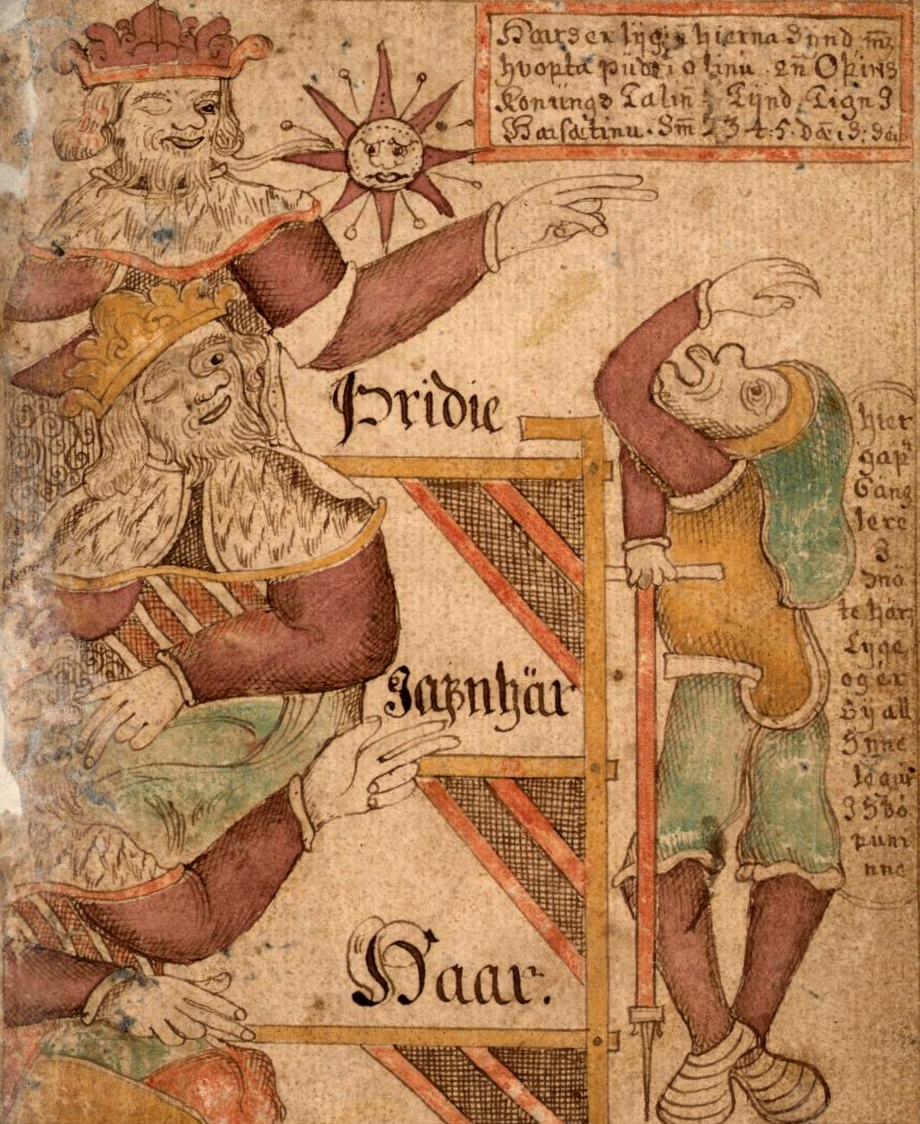
Gylfi is tricked in an illustration from Icelandic Manuscript, SÁM 66

Gylfaginning in the Prose Edda and the Ynglinga saga tell how the supposedly historic (non-deified version) Odin and his people the Æsir and Vanir, who later became the Swedes, obtained new land where they built the settlement of Old Sigtuna. In Snorri's account Gylfi is supposedly deluded by the Æsir into accepting their religion; hence the name "Gylfaginning", most often interpreted as the "deluding of Gylfi", although '-ginning' is regarded the same as what we recognise in "beginning", thus "the origin of Gylfi" is also possible. Gylfi and the remaining older bronze-age inhabitants of the land then supposedly adopted the religion of the Æsir and began to live under their rule. Snorri presents an outline of Norse mythology through a dialogue between Gylfi and three rulers of the Æsir.

It is possible that Snorri's account is based on an old tradition tracing particular beliefs or foundations of particular Norse cults to this legendary Gylfi. However, it is much more likely that the historic King Gylfi was simply already a follower of the ancient Norse religion and, as such, could easily have passed on these beliefs or stories.

== Other appearances ==
In one version of Hervarar saga, king Gylfi married his daughter Heiðr to Sigrlami, the king of Garðaríki (Russia). Heiðr and Sigrlami had the son Svafrlami, who forced the two dwarves Dvalin and Durin to forge the magic sword Tyrfing.

A Gylfi is attested in the lineage of sea-kings in Hversu Noregr byggðist, a saga sketching out an origin myth of Norway, where he appears as the brother of Glamma, eponymous of the longest river in Norway, now spelled Glomma, sons of Geitir, apparently one of four sons of Gor the brother of Nór, eponymous first king of Nórway. The connection with Glamma is interesting regarding how Gylfi is attested in Ynglinga saga particularly connecting him to the longest river system in Scandinavia, now carrying four different names beginning as Femund river and Trysil river in Norway, then Klarälven in Sweden, above the rather big lake Vänern into which it drains, central to the story of Gefjon in Ynglinga saga, and finally Göta älv that drains lake Vänern into the Kattegat, at the city of Gothenburg, on the western coast of Sweden. Hversu Noregr byggðist is loaded with eponymous tales to such an extent that to not connect this Gylfi with this river system would be kind of ignorant. One will find some common sources of the drainage-system forming the signified rivers in the Mountain-region of Norway, turning into Rena River as a tributary to Glomma, and Femund River, as a tributary to Kläraälven. The lake Korssjøen which drains to the east into the Femund River and the drainage system reaching the sea by Gothenburg in Sweden, and the lake Narsjøen that drains to the north into Nørå River and Glomma running south, reaching the sea close to Fredrikstad by the Oslofjord.

== Notes ==
Preceded by New creation	Mythological king of Sweden	Succeeded by Odin
