= Ragnarök =

End times in Norse mythology

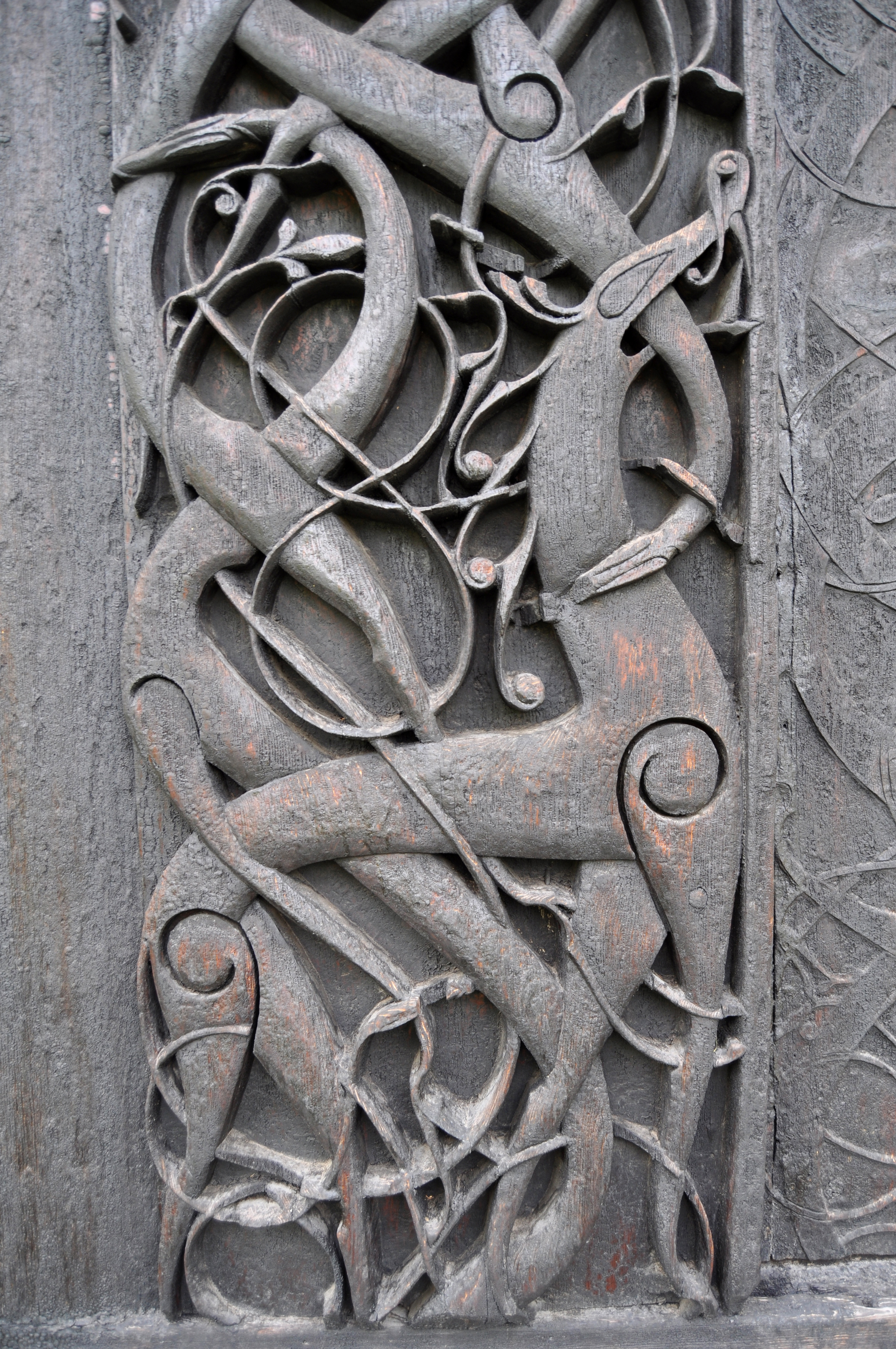
The north portal of the 12th-century Urnes stave church has been interpreted as containing depictions of snakes and dragons that represent Ragnarök.

In Norse mythology, Ragnarök (also Ragnarok; /ˈræɡnərɒk/ RAG-nə-rok or /ˈrɑːɡ-/ RAHG-; Old Norse: Ragnarǫk [ˈrɑɣnɑˌrɒk]) is a foretold series of impending events, including a great battle in which numerous great Norse mythological figures will perish (including the gods Odin, Thor, Týr, Freyr, Heimdall, and Loki); it will entail a catastrophic series of natural disasters, including the burning of the world, and culminate in the submersion of the world underwater. After these events, the world will rise again, cleansed and fertile, the surviving and returning gods will meet, and the world will be repopulated by two human survivors, Líf and Lífþrasir. Ragnarök is an important event in Norse mythology and has been the subject of scholarly discourse and theory in the history of Germanic studies.

The event is attested primarily in the Poetic Edda, compiled in the 13th century from earlier traditional sources, and the Prose Edda, written in the 13th century by Snorri Sturluson. In the Prose Edda and in a single poem in the Poetic Edda, the event is referred to as Ragnarøkkr (Old Norse for 'Twilight of the Gods'), a usage popularised by 19th-century composer Richard Wagner with the title of the last of his Der Ring des Nibelungen operas, Götterdämmerung (1876), which is "Twilight of the Gods" in German.

== Etymology ==
The Old Norse compound ragnarok has a long history of interpretation. Its first element is clear: ragna, the genitive plural of regin (n. pl.) 'the ruling powers, gods.' The second element is more problematic, as it occurs in two variants, -rök and -røkkr. Writing in the early 20th century, philologist Geir T. Zoëga treats the two forms as two separate compounds, glossing ragnarök as 'the doom or destruction of the gods' and ragnarøkkr as 'the twilight of the gods.' The plural noun rök has several meanings, including 'development', 'origin', 'cause', 'relation', 'fate.' The word ragnarök as a whole is then usually interpreted as the 'final destiny of the gods.'

The singular form ragnarøk(k)r is found in a stanza of the Poetic Edda poem Lokasenna, and in the Prose Edda. The noun røk(k)r means 'twilight' (from the verb røkkva 'to grow dark'), suggesting a translation 'twilight of the gods.' This reading was widely considered a result of folk etymology, or a learned reinterpretation of the original term due to the merger of /ɔ/ (spelled ǫ) and /ø/ (spelled ø) in Old Icelandic after c. 1200 (nevertheless giving rise to the calque Götterdämmerung 'Twilight of the Gods' in the German reception of Norse mythology).

Other terms used to refer to the events surrounding Ragnarök in the Poetic Edda include aldar rök (aldar means age, 'end of an age') from a stanza of Vafþrúðnismál, tíva rök from two stanzas of Vafþrúðnismál, þá er regin deyja ('when the gods die') from Vafþrúðnismál, unz um rjúfask regin ('when the gods will be destroyed') from Vafþrúðnismál, Lokasenna, and Sigrdrífumál, aldar rof ('destruction of the age') from Helgakviða Hundingsbana II, regin þrjóta ('end of the gods') from Hyndluljóð, and, in the Prose Edda, þá er Muspellz-synir herja ('when the sons of Muspell move into battle') can be found in chapters 18 and 36 of Gylfaginning.

== Presence in literature ==
=== Poetic Edda ===
The Poetic Edda contains various references to Ragnarök:

==== Völuspá ====
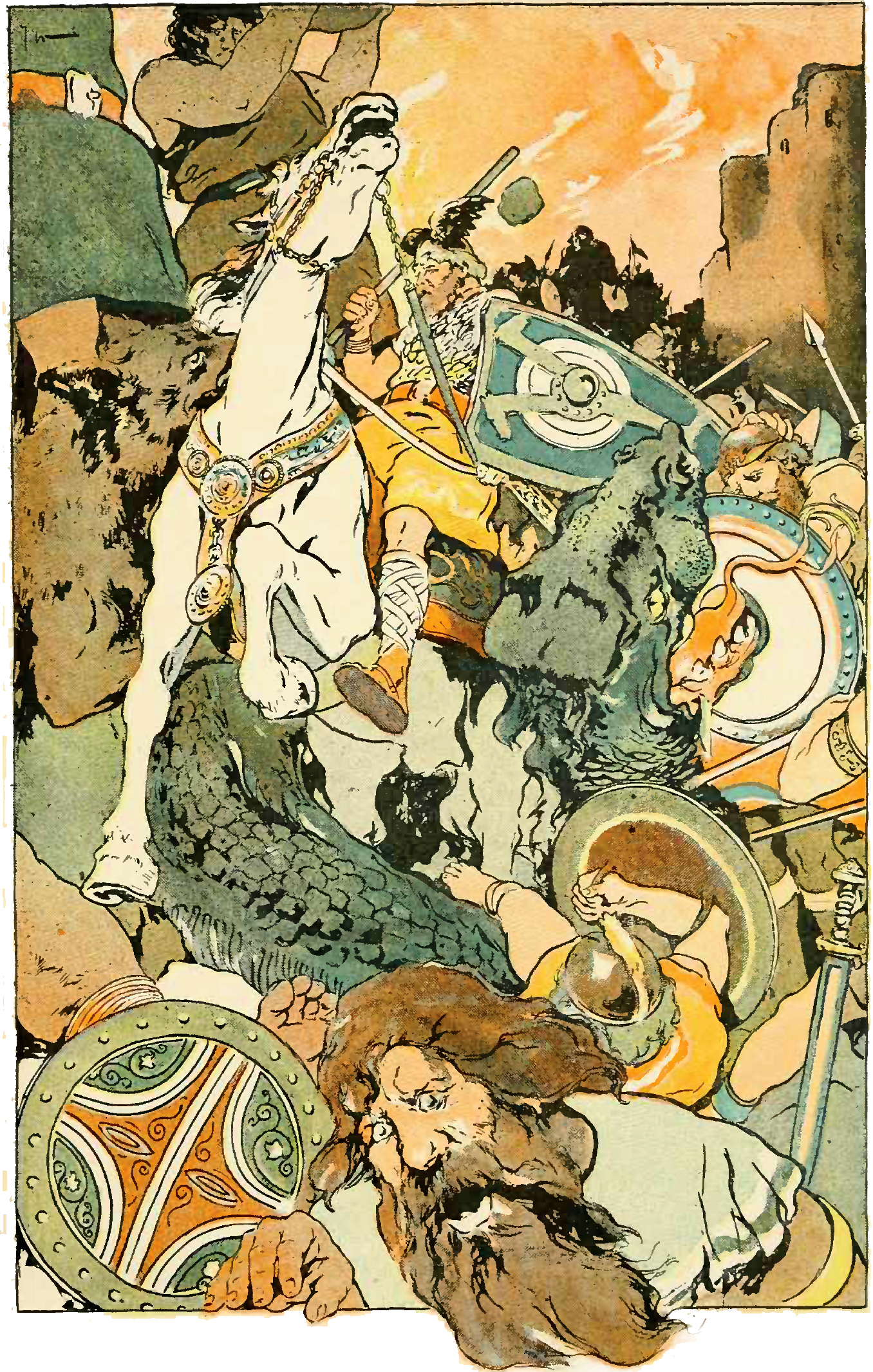
Then the Awful Fight Began (by George Wright, 1908)

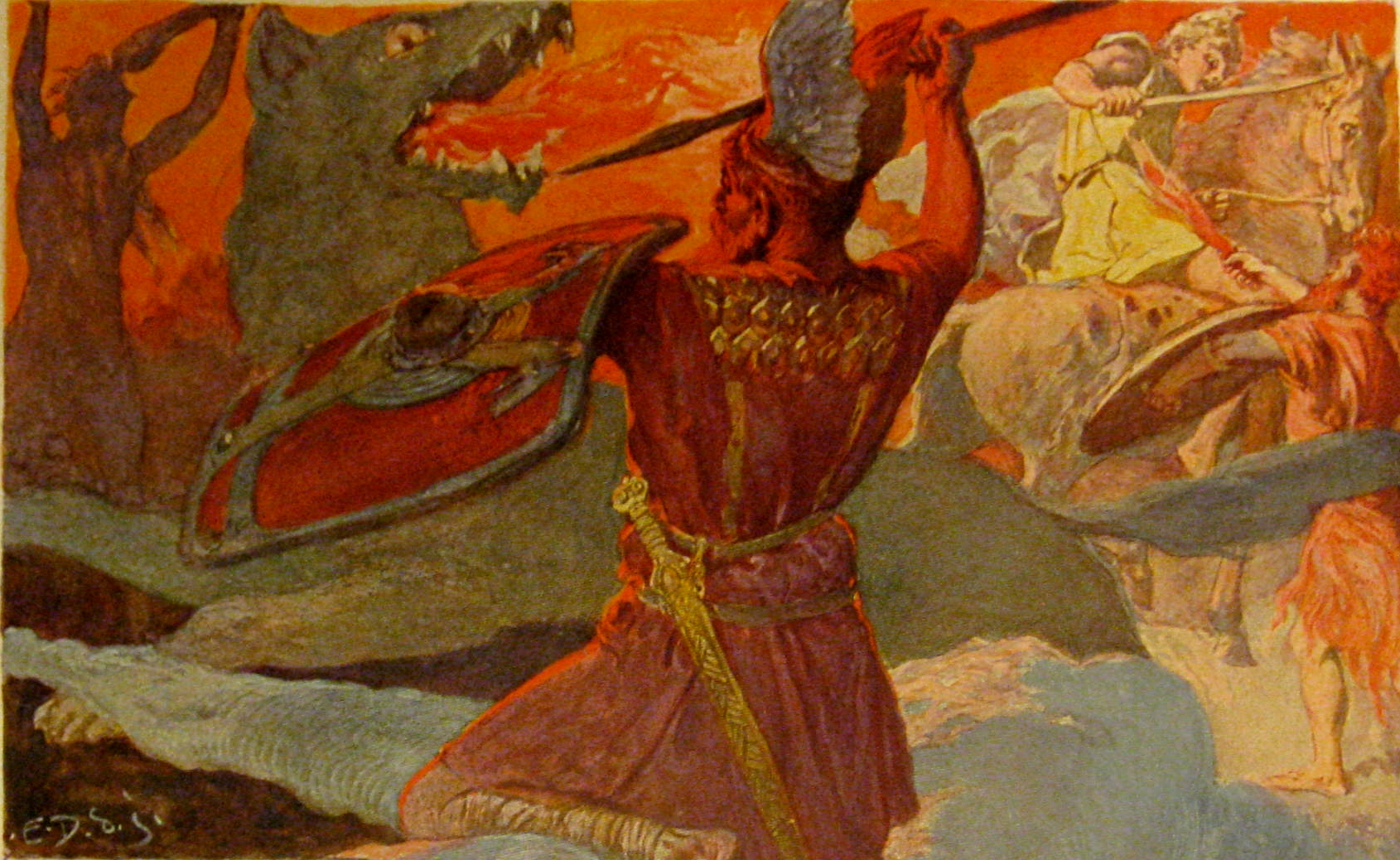
Odin and Fenrir, Freyr and Surt (by Emil Doepler, 1905)

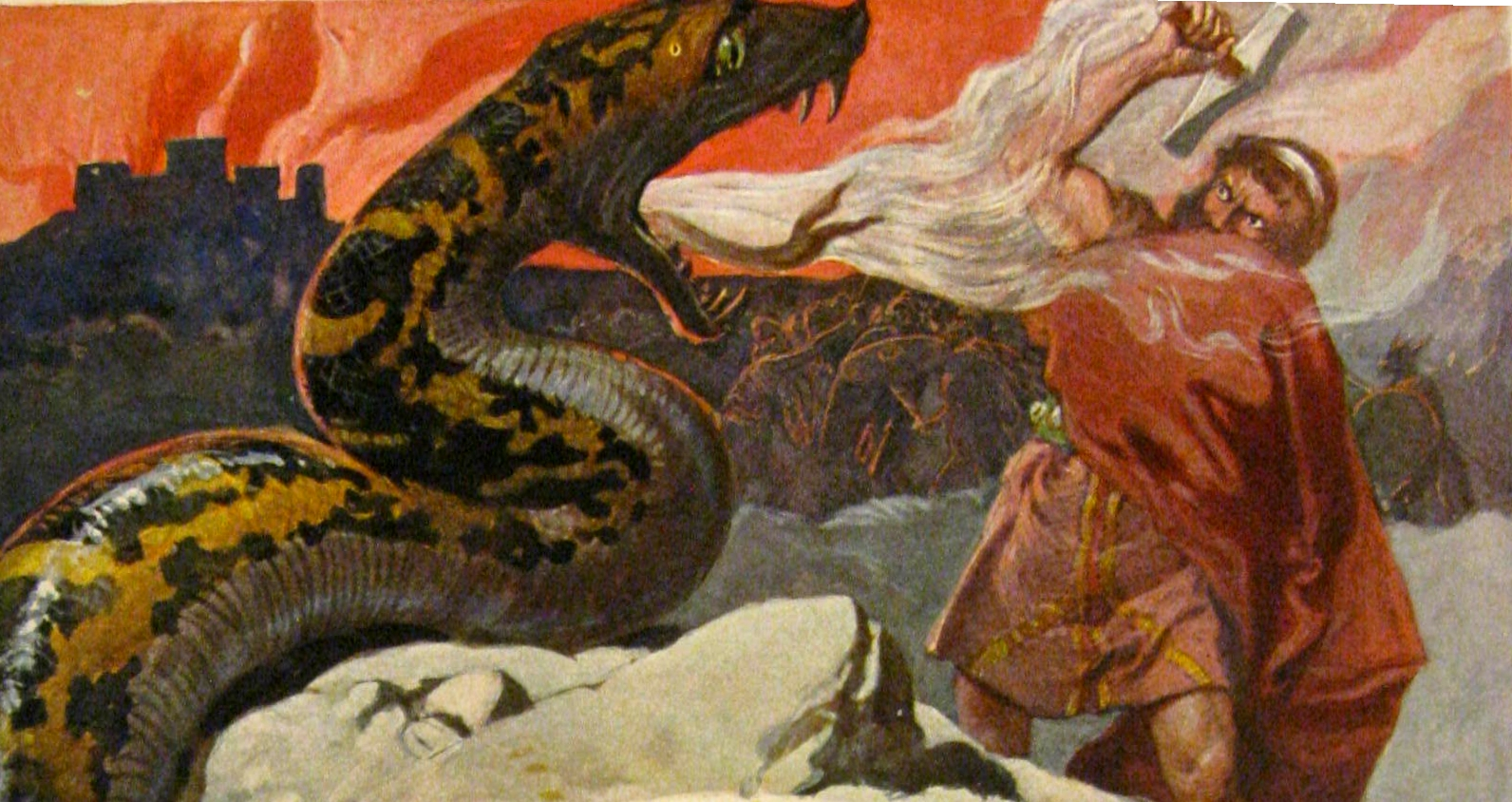
Thor and the Midgard Serpent (by Emil Doepler, 1905)

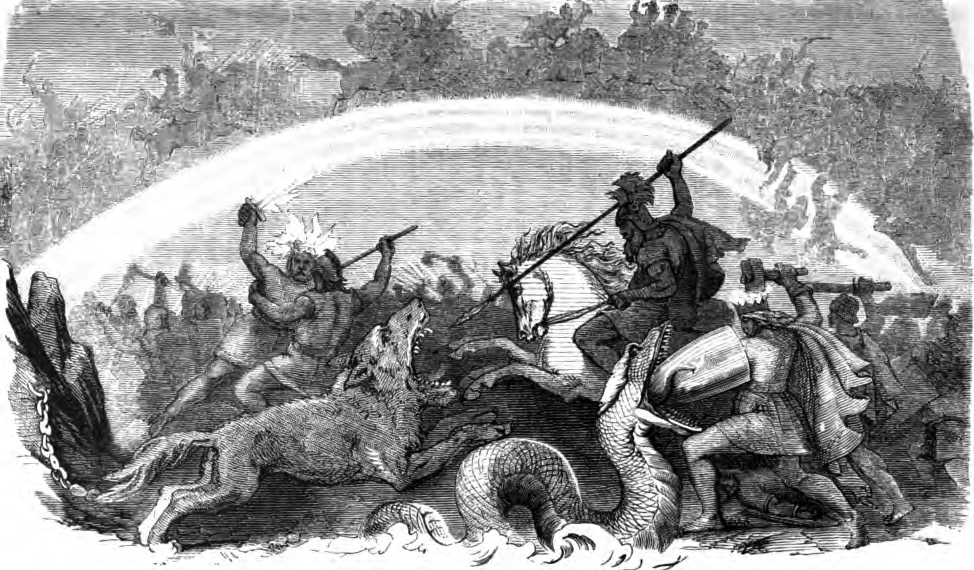
Battle of the Doomed Gods (by Friedrich Wilhelm Heine, 1882)

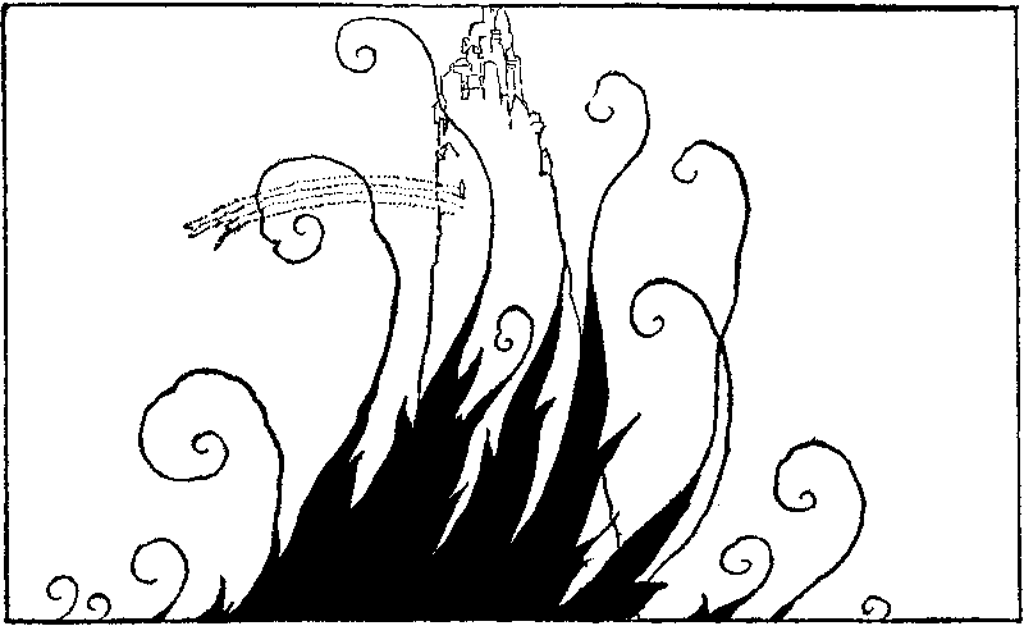
The twilight of the gods (by Willy Pogany, 1920)

In the Poetic Edda poem Völuspá, references to Ragnarök begin from stanza 40 until 58, with the rest of the poem describing the aftermath. In the poem, a völva (a female seer) recites information to Odin. In stanza 41, the völva says:

Fylliz fiǫrvi feigra manna,
rýðr ragna siǫt rauðom dreyra.
Svǫrt verða sólskin of sumor eptir,
veðr ǫll válynd. Vitoð ér enn, eða hvat?

— Normalized Old Norse
Translation:

It sates itself on the life-blood of fated men,
paints red the powers' homes with crimson gore.
Black become the sun's beams in the summers that follow,
weathers all treacherous. Do you still seek to know? And what?

— Ursula Dronke translation

The völva then describes three roosters crowing: In stanza 42, the jötunn herdsman Eggthér sits on a mound and cheerfully plays his harp while the crimson rooster Fjalar (Old Norse "hider, deceiver") crows in the forest Gálgviðr. The golden rooster Gullinkambi crows to the Æsir in Valhalla, and the third, unnamed soot-red rooster crows in the halls of the underworld location of Hel in stanza 43.

After these stanzas, the völva further relates that the hound Garmr produces deep howls in front of the cave of Gnipahellir. Garmr's bindings break and he runs free. The völva describes the state of humanity:

Brœðr muno beriaz ok at bǫnom verða[z]
muno systrungar sifiom spilla.
Hart er í heimi, hórdómr mikill
—skeggǫld, skálmǫld —skildir ro klofnir—
vindǫld, vargǫld— áðr verǫld steypiz.
Mun engi maðr ǫðrom þyrma.

— Normalized Old Norse
Translation:

Brothers will fight and kill each other,
sisters' children will defile kinship.
It is harsh in the world, whoredom rife
—an axe age, a sword age —shields are riven—
a wind age, a wolf age— before the world goes headlong.
No man will have mercy on another.

— Ursula Dronke translation

The "sons of Mím" are described as being "at play," though this reference is not further explained in surviving sources. Heimdall raises the Gjallarhorn into the air and blows deeply into it, and Odin converses with Mím's head. The world tree Yggdrasil shudders and groans. The jötunn Hrym comes from the east, his shield before him. The Midgard serpent Jörmungandr furiously writhes, causing waves to crash. "The eagle shrieks, pale-beaked he tears the corpse," and the ship Naglfar breaks free thanks to the waves made by Jörmungandr and sets sail from the east. The fire jötnar inhabitants of Muspelheim come forth.

The völva continues that Jötunheimr, the land of the jötnar, is aroar, and that the Æsir are in council. The dwarfs groan by their stone doors. Surtr advances from the south, his sword brighter than the sun. Rocky cliffs open and the jötnar women sink.

The gods then do battle with the invaders: Odin is swallowed whole and alive fighting the wolf Fenrir, causing his wife Frigg her second great sorrow (the first being the death of her son, the god Baldr). Odin's son Víðarr avenges his father by rending Fenrir's jaws apart and stabbing it in the heart with his spear, thus killing the wolf. The serpent Jörmungandr opens its gaping maw, yawning widely in the air, and is met in combat by Thor. Thor, also a son of Odin and described here as protector of the earth, furiously fights the serpent, defeating it, but Thor is only able to take nine steps afterwards before collapsing dead from the Serpent's venom. The god Freyr fights Surtr and loses. After this, people flee their homes, and the sun becomes black while the earth sinks into the sea, the stars vanish, steam rises, and flames touch the heavens.

The völva sees the earth reappearing from the water and an eagle over a waterfall hunting fish on a mountain. The surviving Æsir meet together at the field of Iðavöllr. They discuss Jörmungandr, great events of the past, and the runic alphabet. In stanza 61, in the grass, they find the golden game pieces that the gods are described as having once happily enjoyed playing games with long ago (attested earlier in the same poem). The reemerged fields grow without needing to be sown. The gods Höðr and Baldr return from Hel and live happily together.

The völva says that the god Hœnir chooses wooden slips for divination and that the sons of two brothers will widely inhabit the windy world. She sees a hall thatched with gold in Gimlé, where nobility will live and spend their lives pleasurably. Stanzas 65, found in the Hauksbók version of the poem, refers to a "powerful, mighty one" that "rules over everything" and who will arrive from above at the court of the gods (Old Norse regindómr), which has been interpreted as a Christian addition to the poem. In stanza 66, the völva ends her account with a description of the dragon Níðhöggr, corpses in his jaws, flying through the air. The völva then "sinks down." It is unclear if stanza 66 indicates that the völva is referring to the present time or if this is an element of the post-Ragnarök world.

==== Vafþrúðnismál ====
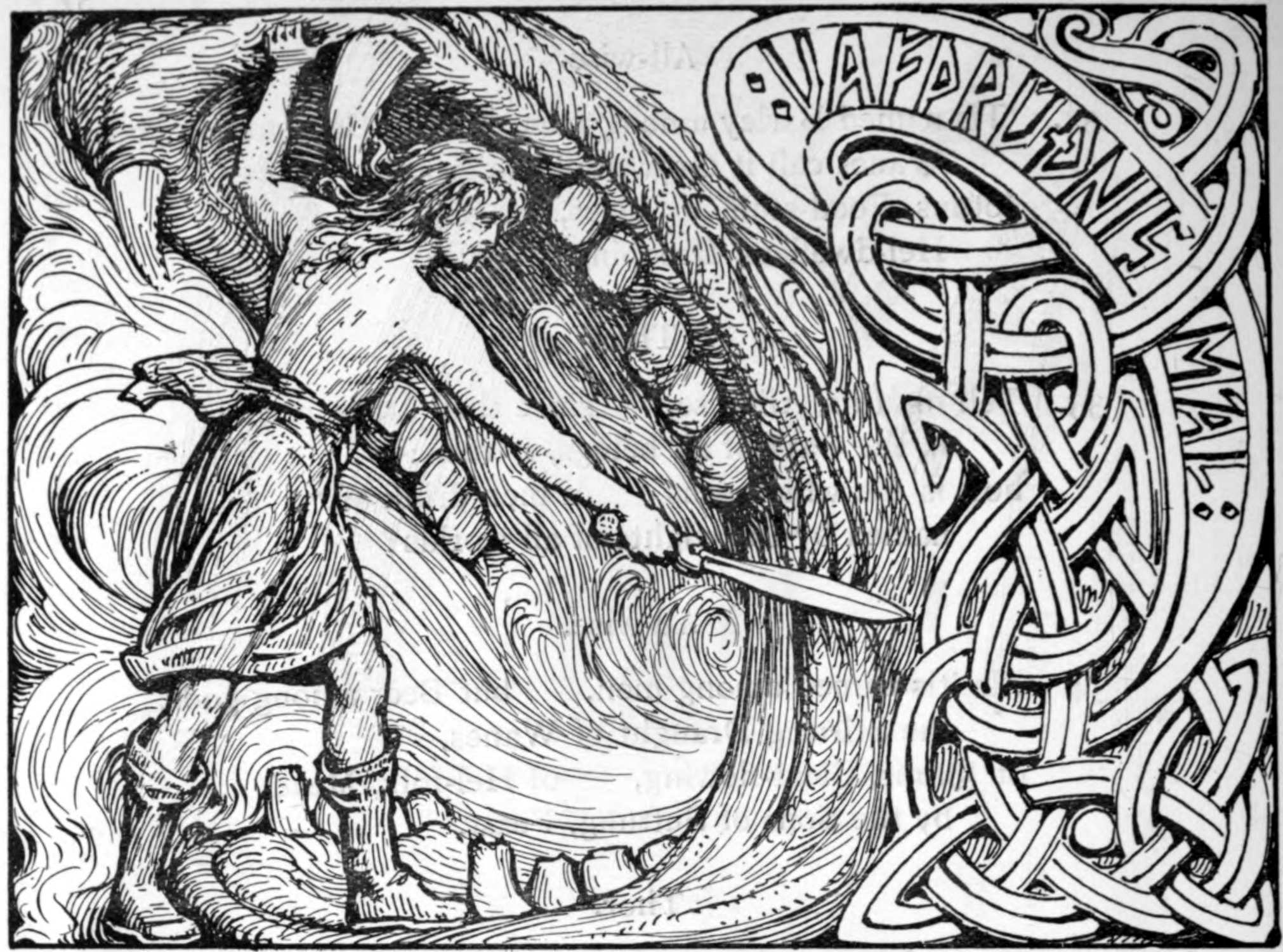
An illustration of Víðarr stabbing Fenrir while holding his jaws apart (by W. G. Collingwood, inspired by the Gosforth Cross, 1908)

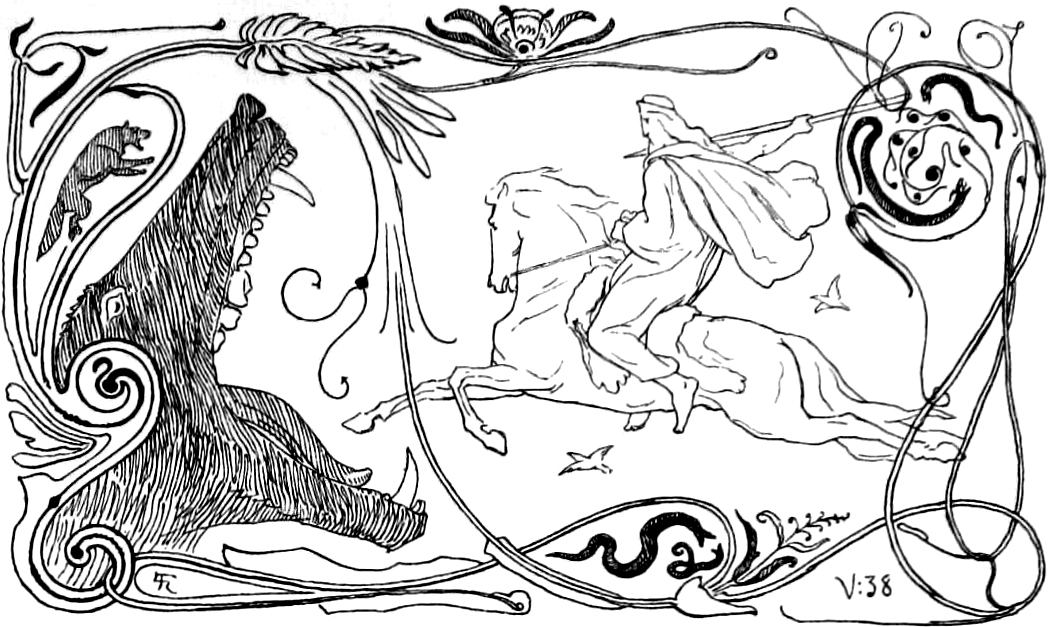
Fenrir and Odin (by Lorenz Frølich, 1895)

The Vanir god Njörðr is mentioned in relation to Ragnarök in stanza 39 of the poem Vafþrúðnismál. In the poem, Odin, disguised as Gagnráðr, faces off with the wise jötunn Vafþrúðnir in a battle of wits. Vafþrúðnismál references Njörðr's status as a hostage during the earlier Æsir–Vanir War, and that he will "come back home among the wise Vanir" at "the doom of men."

In stanza 44, Odin poses the question to Vafþrúðnir as to who of mankind will survive the "famous" Fimbulwinter ("Mighty Winter"). Vafþrúðnir responds in stanza 45 that those survivors will be Líf and Lífþrasir and that they will hide in the forest of Hoddmímis holt, that they will consume the morning dew, and will produce generations of offspring. In stanza 46, Odin asks what sun will come into the sky after Fenrir has consumed the sun that exists. Vafþrúðnir responds that Sól will bear a daughter before Fenrir assails her and that after Ragnarök this daughter will continue her mother's path.

In stanza 51, Vafþrúðnir states that, after Surtr's flames have been sated, Odin's sons Víðarr and Váli will live in the temples of the gods, and that Thor's sons Móði and Magni will possess the hammer Mjolnir. In stanza 52, the disguised Odin asks the jötunn about his fate. Vafþrúðnir responds that "the wolf" will consume Odin, and that Víðarr will avenge him by sundering its cold jaws in battle. Odin ends the duel with one final question: what did Odin say to his son before preparing his funeral pyre? With this, Vafþrúðnir realizes that he is dealing with none other than Odin, whom he refers to as "the wisest of beings," adding that Odin alone could know this. Odin's message has been interpreted as a promise of resurrection to Baldr after Ragnarök.

==== Helgakviða Hundingsbana II ====
Ragnarök is briefly referenced in stanza 40 of the poem Helgakviða Hundingsbana II. Here, the valkyrie Sigrún's unnamed maid is passing the deceased hero Helgi Hundingsbane's burial mound. Helgi is there with a retinue of men, surprising the maid. The maid asks if she is witnessing a delusion since she sees dead men riding, or if Ragnarök has occurred. In stanza 41, Helgi responds that it is neither.

=== Prose Edda ===
Snorri Sturluson's Prose Edda quotes heavily from Völuspá and elaborates extensively in prose on the information there, though some of this information conflicts with that provided in Völuspá.

==== Gylfaginning chapters 26 and 34 ====
Loki breaks free at the onset of Ragnarök (by Ernst H. Walther, 1897)

In the Prose Edda book Gylfaginning, various references are made to Ragnarök. Ragnarök is first mentioned in chapter 26, where the throned figure of High, king of the hall, tells Gangleri (King Gylfi in disguise) some basic information about the goddess Iðunn, including that her apples will keep the gods young until Ragnarök.

In chapter 34, High describes the binding of the wolf Fenrir by the gods, causing the god Týr to lose his right hand, and that Fenrir remains there until Ragnarök. Gangleri asks High why, since the gods could only expect destruction from Fenrir, they did not simply kill Fenrir once he was bound. High responds that "the gods hold their sacred places and sanctuaries in such respect that they chose not to defile them with the wolf's blood, even though the prophecies foretold that he would be the death of Odin."

As a consequence of his role in the death of the god Baldr, Loki (described as father of Fenrir) is bound on top of three stones with the internal organs of his son Narfi (which are turned into iron) in three places. There, venom drops onto his face periodically from a snake placed by the jötunn Skaði. Loki's wife Sigyn collects the venom into a bucket, but whenever she leaves to empty it, the drops reach Loki's face, and the pain he experiences causes convulsions, resulting in earthquakes. Loki is further described as being bound this way until the onset of Ragnarök.

==== Gylfaginning chapter 51 ====
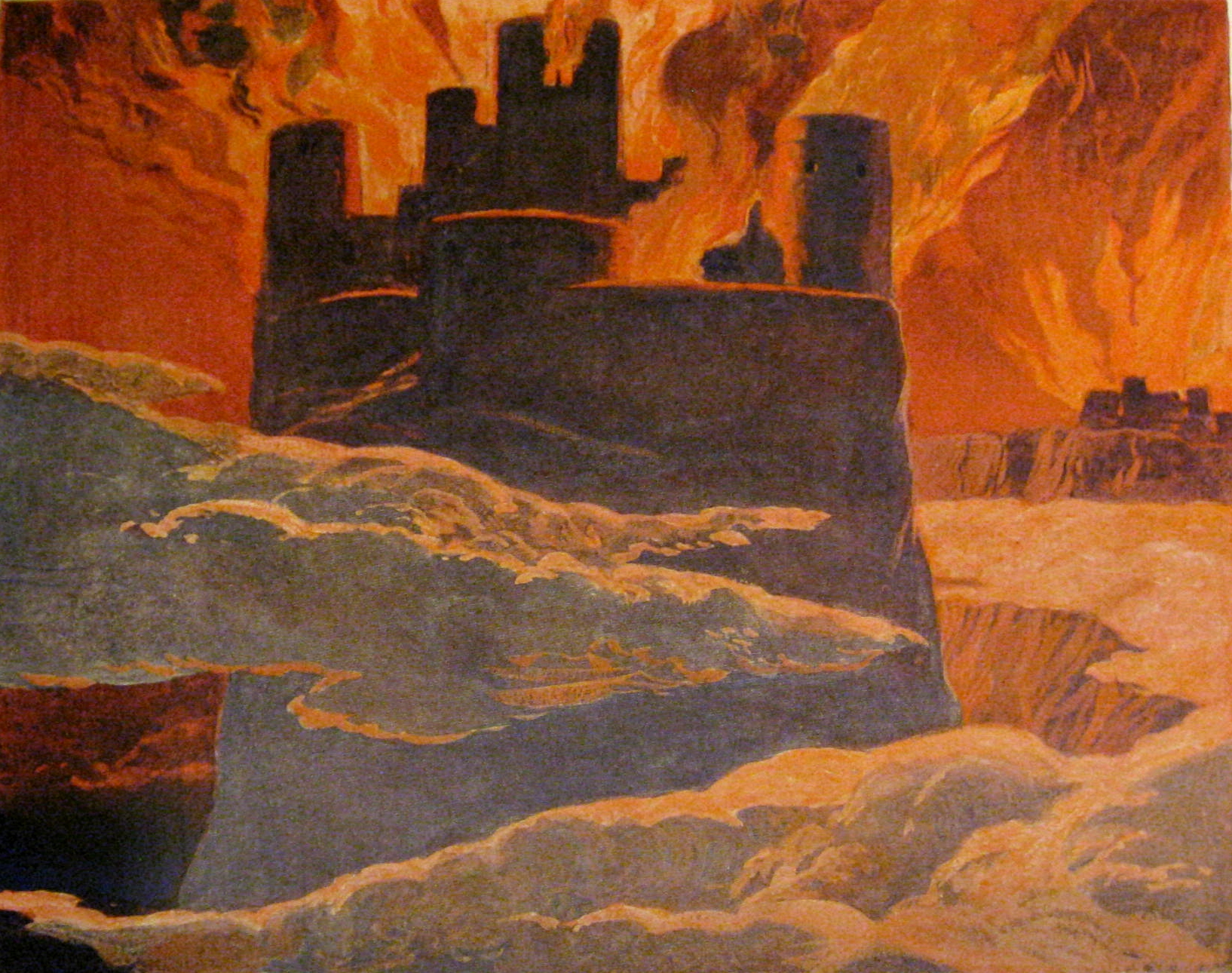
A scene from the last phase of Ragnarök, after Surtr has engulfed the world with fire (by Emil Doepler, 1905)

Chapter 51 provides a detailed account of Ragnarök interspersed with various quotes from Völuspá, while chapters 52 and 53 describe the aftermath of these events. In Chapter 51, High states that the first sign of Ragnarök will be Fimbulwinter, during which time three winters will arrive without a summer, and the sun will be useless. High details that, before these winters, three earlier winters will have occurred, marked with great battles throughout the world. During this time, greed will cause brothers to kill brothers, and fathers and sons will suffer from the collapse of kinship bonds. High then quotes stanza 45 of Völuspá. Next, High describes that the wolf will swallow the sun, then his brother will swallow the moon, and mankind will consider the occurrence as a great disaster resulting in much ruin. The stars will disappear. The earth and mountains will shake so violently that the trees will come loose from the soil, the mountains will topple, and all restraints will break, causing Fenrir to break free from his bonds.

High relates that the great serpent Jörmungandr, also described as a child of Loki in the same source, will breach land as the sea violently swells onto it. The ship Naglfar, described in the Prose Edda as being made from the human nails of the dead, is released from its mooring and sets sail on the surging sea, steered by a jötunn named Hrym. At the same time, Fenrir, eyes and nostrils spraying flames, charges forward with his mouth wide open, his upper jaw reaching to the heavens, and his lower jaw touching the earth. At Fenrir's side, Jörmungandr sprays venom throughout the air and the sea.

During all of this, the sky splits into two. From the split, the "sons of Muspell" ride forth. Surtr rides first, surrounded by flames, his sword brighter than the sun. High says that "Muspell's sons" will ride across Bifröst, described in Gylfaginning as a rainbow bridge, and that the bridge will then break. The sons of Muspell (and their shining battle troop) advance to the field of Vígríðr, described as an expanse that reaches "a hundred leagues in each direction," where Fenrir, Jörmungandr, Loki (followed by "Hel's own"), and Hrym (accompanied by all frost jötnar) join them. While this occurs, Heimdallr stands and blows the Gjallarhorn with all his might. The gods awaken at the sound, and they meet. Odin rides to Mímisbrunnr in search of counsel from Mímir. Yggdrasil shakes, and everything, everywhere fears.

High relates that the Æsir and the Einherjar dress for war and head to the field. Odin, wearing a gold helmet and an intricate coat of mail, carries his spear Gungnir and rides before them. Odin advances against Fenrir, while Thor moves at his side, though Thor is unable to assist Odin because he has engaged Jörmungandr in combat. According to High, Freyr fights fiercely with Surtr, but falls because he lacks the sword he once gave to his messenger, Skírnir. The hound Garmr (described here as the "worst of monsters") breaks free from his bonds in front of Gnipahellir, and fights the god Týr, resulting in both of their deaths.

Thor kills Jörmungandr but is poisoned by the serpent, and manages to walk only nine steps before falling to the earth dead. Fenrir swallows Odin, though immediately afterwards his son Víðarr kicks his foot into Fenrir's lower jaw, grips the upper jaw, and rips apart Fenrir's mouth, killing the great wolf. Loki fights Heimdallr and the two kill each other. Surtr covers the earth in fire, causing the entire world to burn. High quotes stanzas 46 to 47 of Völuspá, and additionally stanza 18 of Vafþrúðnismál (the latter relating information about the battlefield Vígríðr).

==== Gylfaginning chapters 52 and 53 ====
At the beginning of chapter 52, Gangleri asks "what will be after heaven and earth and the whole world are burned? All the gods will be dead, together with the Einherjar and the whole of mankind. Didn't you say earlier that each person will live in some world throughout all ages?"

The figure of Third, seated on the highest throne in the hall, responds that there will be many good places to live, but also many bad ones. Third states that the best place to be is Gimlé in the heavens, where a place exists called Okolnir that houses a hall called Brimir—where one can find plenty to drink. Third describes a hall made of red gold located in Niðafjöll called Sindri, where "good and virtuous men will live." Third further relates an unnamed hall in Náströnd, the beaches of the dead, that he describes as a large repugnant hall facing north that is built from the spines of snakes, and resembles "a house with walls woven from branches"; the heads of the snakes face the inside of the house and spew so much venom that rivers of it flow throughout the hall, in which oath breakers and murderers must wade. Third here quotes Völuspá stanzas 38 to 39, with the insertion of original prose stating that the worst place of all to be is in Hvergelmir, followed by a quote from Völuspá to highlight that the dragon Níðhöggr harasses the corpses of the dead there.

Chapter 53 begins with Gangleri asking if any of the gods will survive and if there will be anything left of the earth or the sky. High responds that the earth will appear once more from the sea, beautiful and green, where self-sown crops grow. The field Iðavöllr exists where Asgard once was, and, there, untouched by Surtr's flames, Víðarr and Váli reside. Now possessing their father's hammer Mjölnir, Thor's sons Móði and Magni will meet them there, and, coming from Hel, Baldr and Höðr also arrive. Together, they all sit and recount memories, later finding the gold game pieces the Æsir once owned. Völuspá stanza 51 is then quoted.

High reveals that two humans, Líf and Lífþrasir, will have also survived the destruction by hiding in the wood Hoddmímis holt. These two survivors consume the morning dew for sustenance, and from their descendants, the world will be repopulated. Vafþrúðnismál stanza 45 is then quoted. The personified sun, Sól, will have a daughter at least as beautiful as she, and this daughter will follow the same path as her mother. Vafþrúðnismál stanza 47 is quoted, and so ends the foretelling of Ragnarök in Gylfaginning.

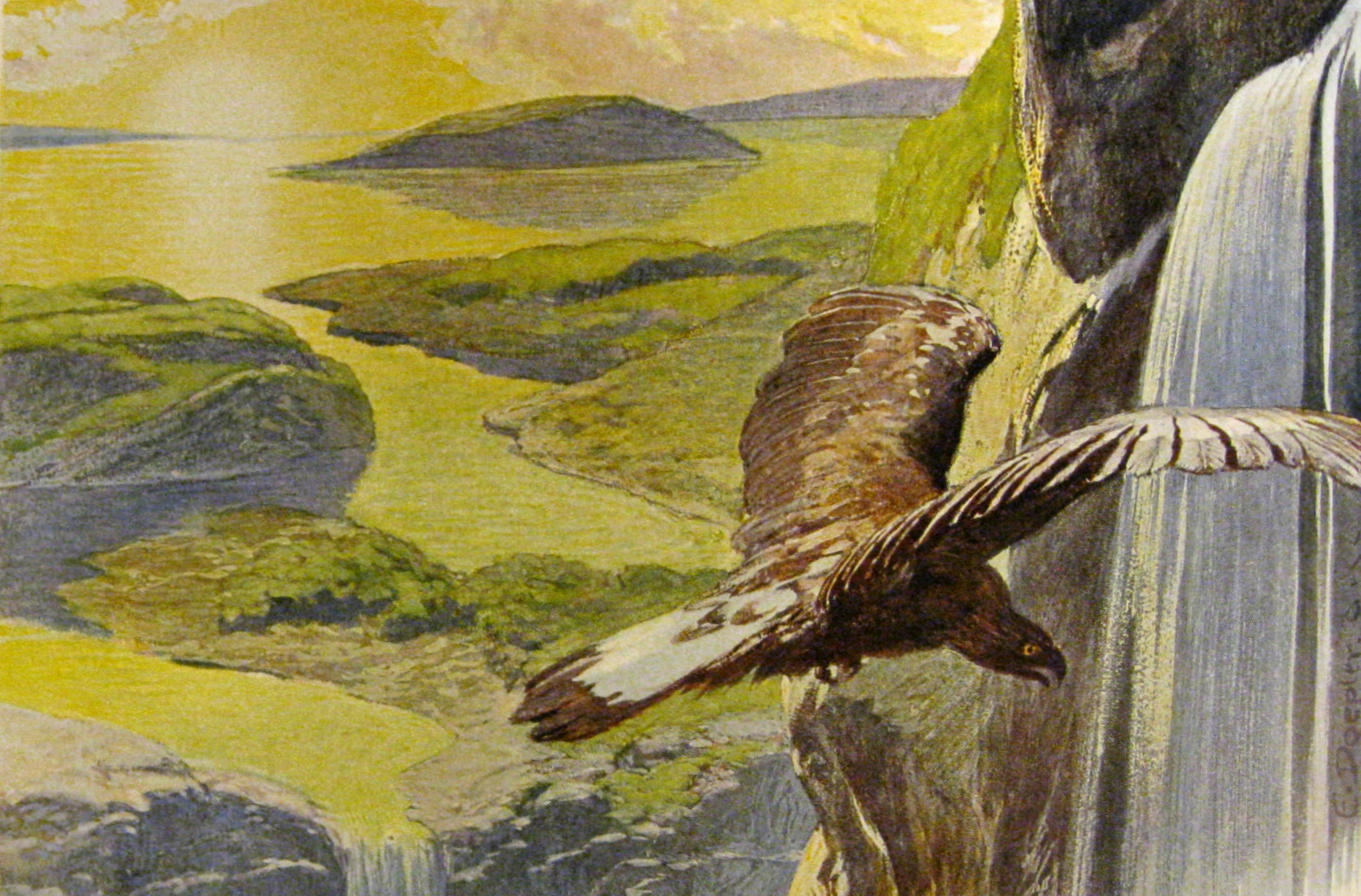
The new world that rises after Ragnarök, as described in Völuspá (depiction by Emil Doepler, 1905)

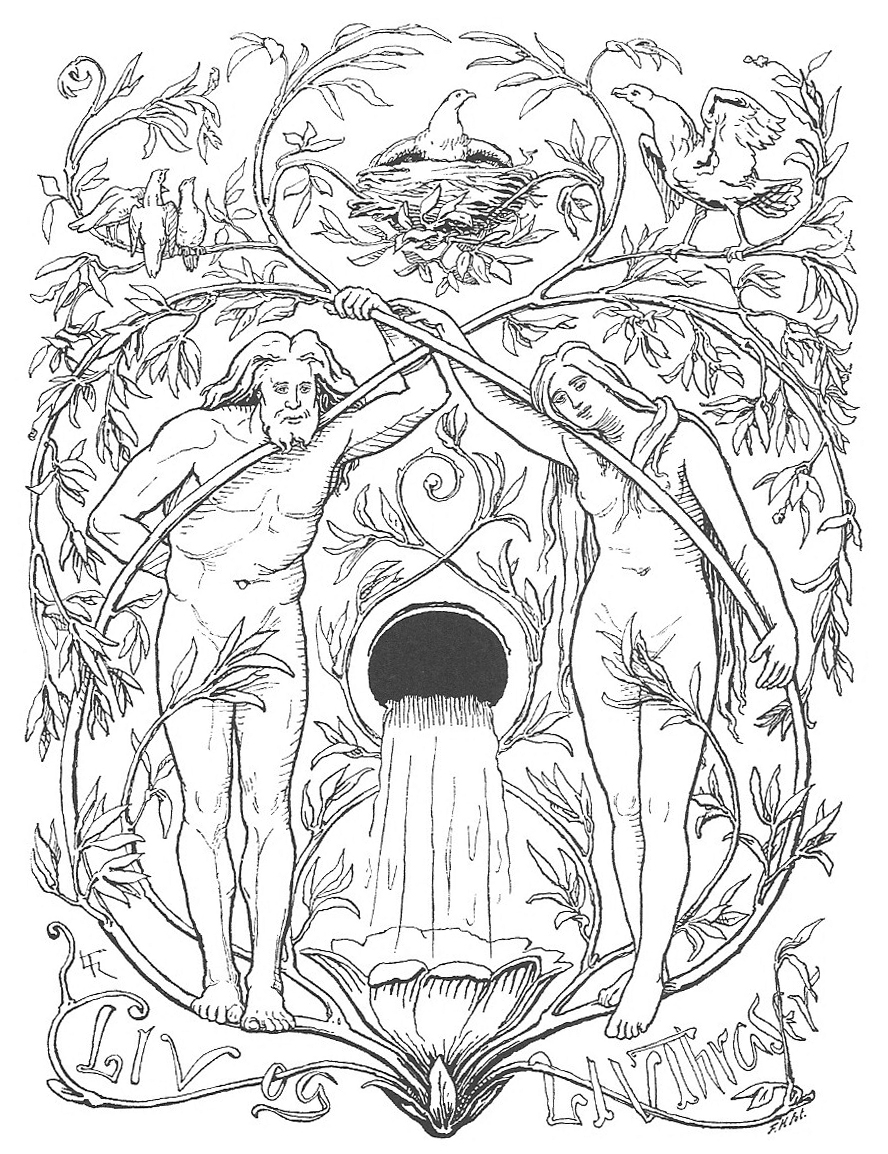
A depiction of Líf and Lífthrasir (by Lorenz Frølich, 1895)

== Archaeological record ==
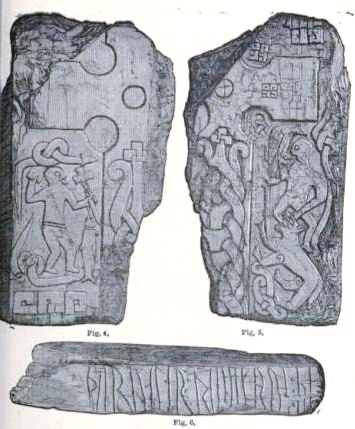
Thorwald's Cross, on the grounds of Kirk Andreas, Isle of Man

Various objects have been identified as depicting events from Ragnarök.

=== Thorwald's Cross ===
Thorwald's Cross, a partially surviving runestone erected at Kirk Andreas on the Isle of Man, depicts a bearded human holding a spear downward at a wolf, his right foot in its mouth, while a large bird sits at his shoulder. Rundata dates it to 940, while Pluskowski dates it to the 11th century. This depiction has been interpreted as Odin, with a raven or eagle at his shoulder, being consumed by Fenrir at Ragnarök. On the other side of the stone is a depiction of a large cross and another image parallel to the Odin figure that has been described as Christ triumphing over Satan. These combined elements have led to the cross as being described as "syncretic art," a mixture of pagan and Christian beliefs.

=== Gosforth Cross ===
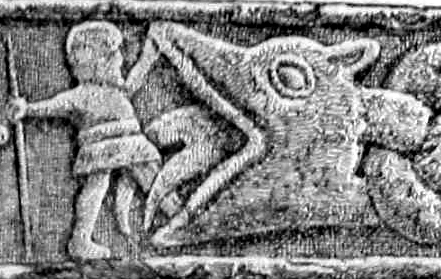
Gosforth Cross, Close up image focused on Víðarr fighting Fenrir

The Gosforth Cross (920–950), in Cumbria, England, is a standing cross of a typical Anglo-Saxon form, carved on all sides of the long shaft, which is nearly square in section. Based on the mythological stories found in Old Norse texts written in Iceland in the twelfth and thirteenth centuries, it has been assumed that the figural carvings of the Gosforth Cross depict Norse mythological episodes connected to Ragnarök. Apart from panels of ornament, the scenes include a Christian crucifixion, and possibly another scene in Hell, but the other scenes are generally interpreted as narrative incidents from the Ragnarök story, even by a scholar as cautious of such interpretations as David M. Wilson. The Ragnarök battle itself may be depicted on the north side. The cross features various figures depicted in Borre style, including a man with a spear facing a monstrous head, with one foot thrust into the beast's forked tongue and on its lower jaw, and the other is against its upper jaw, a scene interpreted as Víðarr fighting Fenrir.

=== Ledberg stone ===
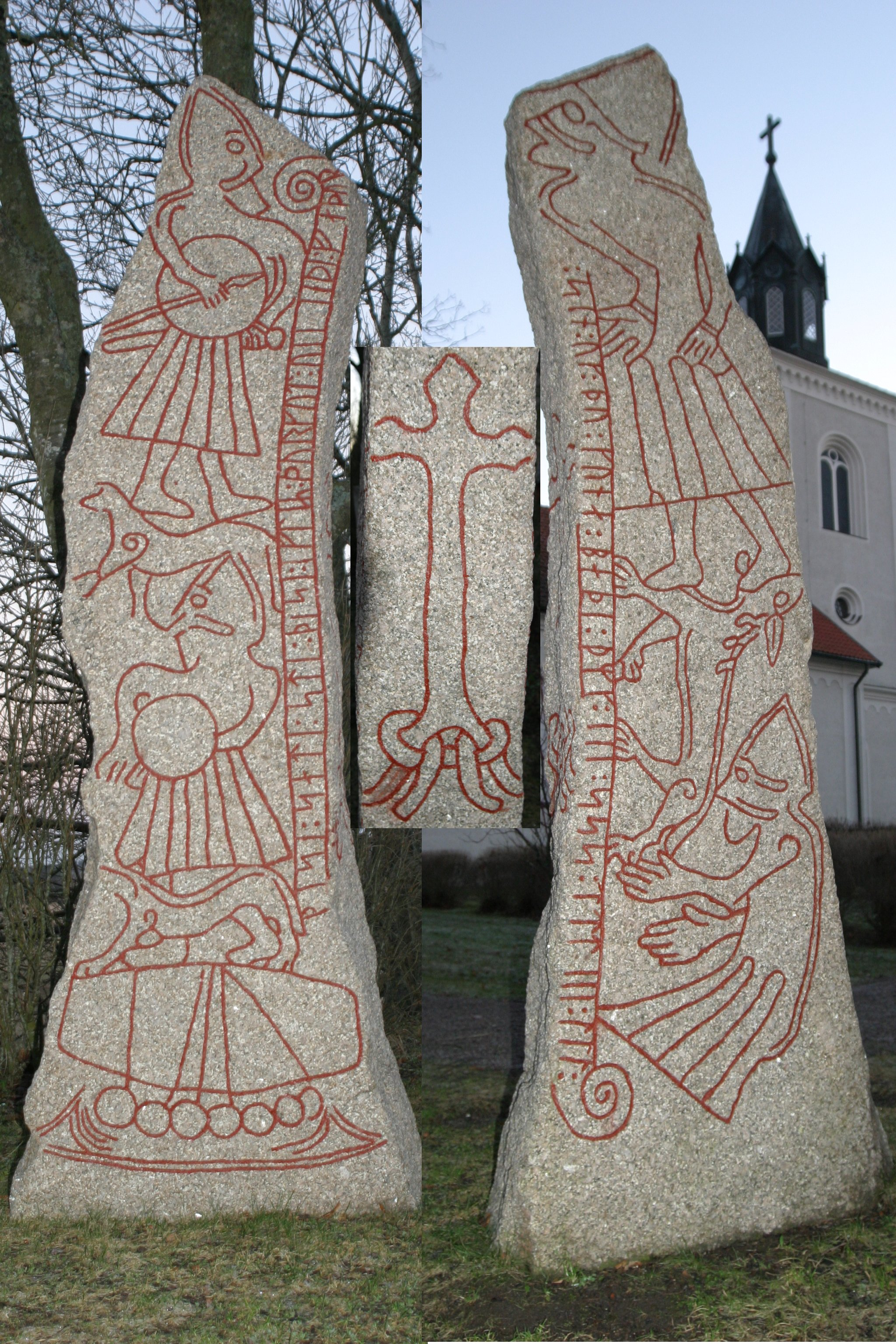
A composite image of three different angles of the Ledberg stone

The 11th-century Ledberg stone in Sweden, similarly to Thorwald's Cross, is regarded as alluding to the final battle of Ragnarök through the stones images. The stone features a figure with his foot at the mouth of a four-legged beast, and this may also be a depiction of Odin being devoured by Fenrir at Ragnarök. Below the beast and the man is a depiction of a legless, helmeted man, with his arms in a prostrate position. The Younger Futhark inscription on the stone bears a commonly seen memorial dedication, but is followed by an encoded runic sequence that has been described as "mysterious," and "an interesting magic formula which is known from all over the ancient Norse world."

=== Skarpåker stone ===
On the early 11th-century Skarpåker Stone, from Södermanland, Sweden, a father grieving his dead son used the same verse form, fornyrðislag, as in the Poetic Edda in the following engraving:

Iarð skal rifna
ok upphiminn

Translation:

Earth shall be riven
and the over-heaven.

Jansson (1987) notes that at the time of the inscription, everyone who read the lines would have thought of Ragnarök and the allusion that the father found fitting as an expression of his grief. The inscription on the stone depicts a time of religious transition in Viking Age Scandinavia by fusing Christian and Norse components. The presence of a Christian cross on the stone indicates an attempt to combine Norse prophetic themes with Christian concepts of resurrection and endless life. The ship on the stone, with its mast shaped like a cross, is believed to represent the trip to the afterlife, fusing Christian imagery with Viking Age culture.

== Theories and interpretations ==
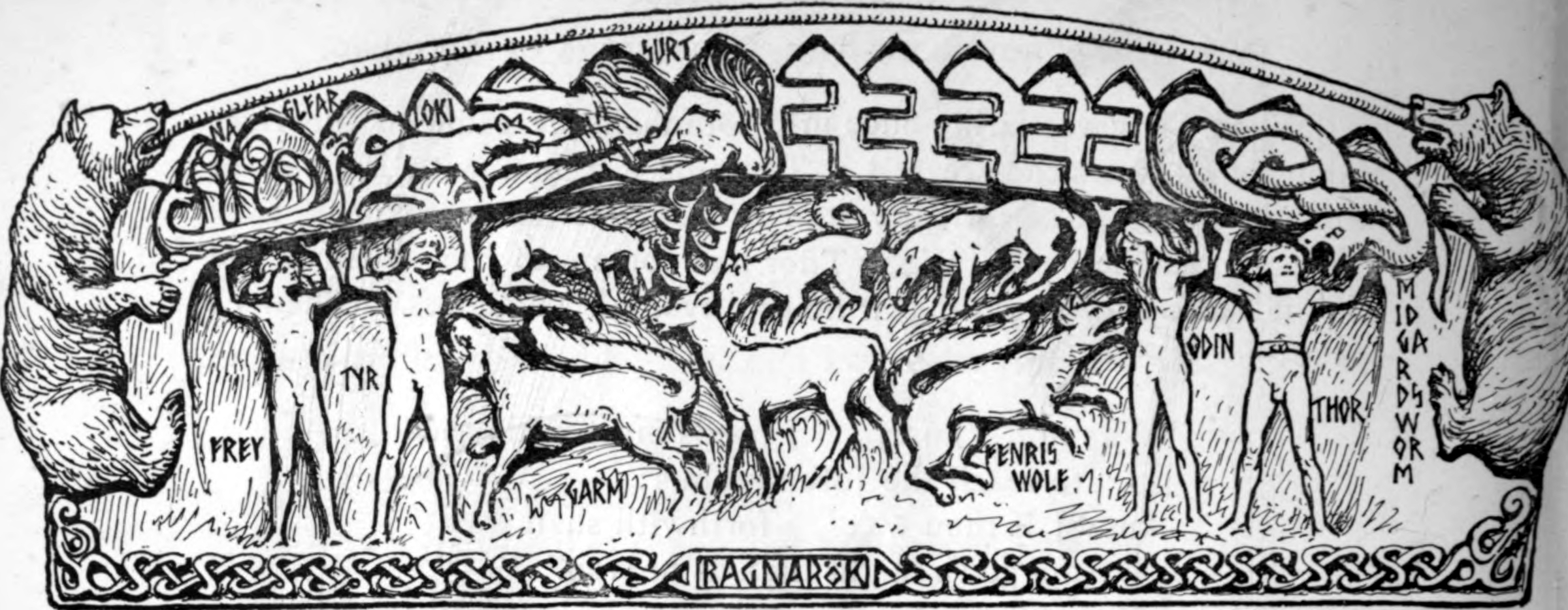
Ragnarök (Motif from the Heysham Hogback) (by W. G. Collingwood, 1908)

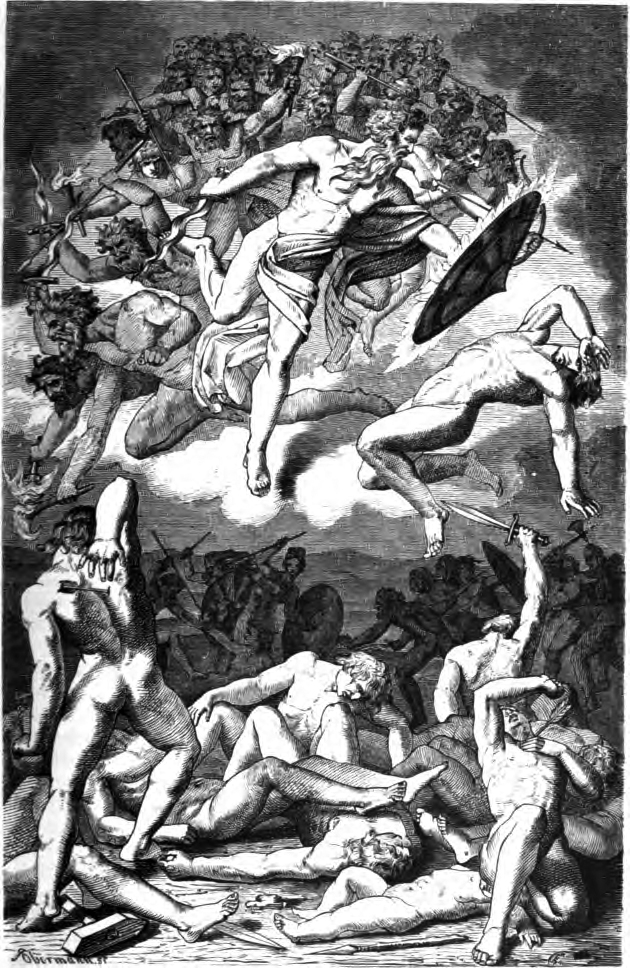
The Downfall of the Æsir by Karl Ehrenberg, 1882

=== Cyclic time and Hoddmímis holt ===
Rudolf Simek theorizes that the survival of Líf and Lífþrasir at the end of Ragnarök is "a case of reduplication of the anthropogeny, understandable from the cyclic nature of the Eddic eschatology." Simek says that Hoddmímis holt "should not be understood literally as a wood or even a forest in which the two keep themselves hidden, but rather as an alternative name for the world-tree Yggdrasill. Thus, the creation of mankind from tree trunks (Askr, Embla) is repeated after the Ragnarök as well." Simek says that in Germanic regions, the concept of mankind originating from trees is ancient, and additionally points out legendary parallels in a Bavarian legend of a shepherd who lives inside a tree, whose descendants repopulate the land after life there has been wiped out by plague (citing a retelling by F. R. Schröder). In addition, Simek points to an Old Norse parallel in the figure of Örvar-Oddr, "who is rejuvenated after living as a tree-man (Ǫrvar-Odds saga 24–27)."

=== Muspille, Heliand, and Christianity ===
Theories have been proposed about the relation between Ragnarök and the 9th-century Old High German epic poem Muspilli about the Christian Last Judgment, where the word Muspille appears, and the 9th-century Old Saxon epic poem Heliand about the life of Christ, where various other forms of the word appear. In both sources, the word is used to signify the end of the world through fire. The Christian thought of the Last Judgment as it is presented in the Book of Revelation is similar to the apocalyptic story of Ragnarök, which features imagery of a final cosmic conflict, devastation, and eventual renewal. Key elements, such as the role of a savior figure and the contrast between divine forces and evil, may mirror Christian theological concepts brought during the conversion of Scandinavia. Old Norse forms of the term also appear throughout accounts of Ragnarök, where the world is also consumed in flames, and, though various theories exist about the meaning and origins of the term, its etymology has not been solved.

=== Proto-Indo-European basis ===
Parallels have been pointed out between the Ragnarök of Norse religion and the beliefs of other related Indo-European peoples. Subsequently, theories have been put forth that Ragnarök represents a later evolution of a Proto-Indo-European belief along with other cultures descending from the Proto-Indo-Europeans. These parallels include comparisons of a cosmic winter motif between the Norse Fimbulwinter, the Iranian Bundahishn and Yima. Víðarr's stride has been compared to the Vedic god Vishnu in that both have a "cosmic stride" with a special shoe used to tear apart a beastly wolf. Larger patterns have also been drawn between "final battle" events in Indo-European cultures, including the occurrence of a blind or semi-blind figure in "final battle" themes, and figures appearing suddenly with surprising skills.

Similar Indo-European mythological elements are highlighted by comparisons between Ragnarök and Iranian prophetic traditions. The wolves' destruction of the sun and moon in Völuspá is consistent with Iranian customs about the Fravashi, divine guardians who intervene against demonic powers to guarantee the sun and moon's paths. Iranian traditions depict this conflict as a part of the world's continuous war between good and evil, whereas Scandinavian mythology depicts the cosmic catastrophe as taking place at the end of time. These parallels highlight a common cosmological concern for upholding order in the face of chaotic forces. Ragnarök epitomizes the Old Norse warrior culture, in which bravery and resistance are used to face death's inevitable course. Gods such as Odin and Thor represent the ideal warrior archetypes, and the tale reflects a deeply ingrained cultural ideal of heroic tenacity. This philosophy supported a worldview in which destruction is not an end but a necessary prerequisite for rebirth. Iranian traditions share similarities with Ragnarök's warrior ethos. Warriors are portrayed in both mythologies as seeking for a spot in paradise, which is known as Valhalla in Norse mythology. This shared ideal reinforces the relationship between apocalyptic myths and societal ideals in Indo-European traditions by reflecting a cultural emphasis on the afterlife as a compensation for bravery and devotion in combat.

=== Volcanic eruptions ===
Hilda Ellis Davidson theorizes that the events in Völuspá occurring after the death of the gods (the sun turning black, steam rising, flames touching the heavens, etc.) may be inspired by the volcanic eruptions on Iceland. Records of eruptions in Iceland bear strong similarities to the sequence of events described in Völuspá, especially the eruption at Laki that occurred in 1783. Bertha Phillpotts theorizes that the figure of Surtr was inspired by Icelandic eruptions and that he was a volcano demon. Surtr's name occurs in some Icelandic place names, among them the lava tube Surtshellir, a number of dark caverns in the volcanic central region of Iceland. This viewpoint is expanded by recent research by Mathias Nordvig and Felix Riede, which connects the apocalyptic themes of Ragnarök to important geological and climatic occurrences in the sixth century AD. Massive volcanic eruptions created a "dust veil" at this time, which produced broad climatic changes throughout the Northern Hemisphere, including as longer periods of darkness and colder temperatures. Known as one of the most intense volcanic winters in history, the years 536–550 AD brought about significant environmental changes in Scandinavia and shifts in settlement patterns during this time of climate disturbance, indicating a social reaction to these environmental issues.

=== Bergbúa þáttr ===
Parallels have been pointed out between a poem spoken by a jötunn found in the 13th-century þáttr Bergbúa þáttr ("the tale of the mountain dweller"). In the tale, Thórd and his servant get lost while travelling to church in winter, and so take shelter for the night within a cave. Inside the cave they hear noises, witness a pair of immense burning eyes, and then the being with burning eyes recites a poem of 12 stanzas. The poem the being recites contains references to Norse mythology (including a mention of Thor) and also prophecies (including that "mountains will tumble, the earth will move, men will be scoured by hot water and burned by fire"). Surtr's fire receives a mention in stanza 10. John Lindow says that the poem may describe "a mix of the destruction of the race of giants and of humans, as in Ragnarök" but that "many of the predictions of disruption on earth could also fit the volcanic activity that is so common in Iceland."

== Modern influences ==
The events of Ragnarok are dramatized, albeit briefly, in Hans Christian Andersen's fairy tale "The Marsh King's Daughter".

In late 2013 and early 2014, English-language media outlets widely reported that Ragnarök was foretold to occur on 22 February 2014. Apparently patterned after the 2012 phenomenon, the claim was at times attributed to a "Viking Calendar". No such calendar is known to have existed, and the source was a "prediction" made to media outlets by the Jorvik Viking Centre in York, England, intended to draw attention to an event that the institution was to hold on that date. The Jorvik Viking Centre was criticized for misleading the public to promote the event. In a 2014 article on the claims, philologist Joseph S. Hopkins perceives the media response as an example of a broad revival of interest in the Viking Age and ancient Germanic topics.

The Norwegian fantasy adventure film Gåten Ragnarok was released in 2013 and centres on the discovery of the mythical serpent in contemporary Finnmark.

The myth is central to the 2017 Marvel Cinematic Universe film Thor: Ragnarok, at whose climax the demon Surtur destroys Asgard as its people flee into space under the guidance of Thor, Valkyrie, Loki, Heimdall, Hulk, and Korg.

A. S. Byatt published a novel entitled Ragnarok: The End of the Gods in 2011.

Ragnarök is set up at the end of the 2018 video game God of War, which is rooted in Norse mythology, after the protagonist Kratos kills Baldr. The 2022 sequel, God of War Ragnarök, deals with the aftermath of this event and covers the in-game version of Ragnarök.

Norse mythology and climate change inspired the eponymous TV series Ragnarok. The town of Edda in Western Norway is plagued by climate change and industrial pollution caused by the factories owned by the Jutul family, a group of jötunn. They are challenged by a teenage boy, Magne, the reincarnation of Thor. Thus begins the event Ragnarok ("twilight of the gods"), the fight against those who are destroying the planet.

In the 2020 video game Assassin's Creed Valhalla, which is partially inspired by Norse mythology, the Æsir are depicted as members of the Isu, who within the series' fictional lore, are an advanced civilization that predate humanity, and Ragnarök refers to a series of events revolving around the Toba Catastrophe, or the "Great Catastrophe", which was a solar flare that hit the Earth, killing most of the Isu. In one of the game's story arcs, the protagonist Eivor Varinsdottir assumes the role of Odin (later revealed to be her previous life), who searches for a way for himself and the other Æsir to survive beyond Ragnarök, during which they are all foretold to perish. One of the game's downloadable content packs, titled Dawn of Ragnarök, builds upon this, as it follows Odin just as the events of Ragnarök are about to begin.

== General references ==
- Bailey, Richard N. (2002). "Scandinavian Myth on Viking-period Stone Sculpture in England". In Barnes, Geraldine; Ross, Margaret Clunies (eds.). Old Norse Myths, Literature, and Society (PDF). Sydney: University of Sydney. ISBN 1-86487-316-7. Archived from the original (PDF) on 14 September 2009.
- Bellows, Henry Adams (2004). The Poetic Edda: The Mythological Poems. Dover Publications. ISBN 0-486-43710-8.
- Bjordvand, Harald; Lindeman, Fredrik Otto (2007). Våre arveord. Novus. ISBN 978-82-7099-467-0.
- Jesse Byock (Trans.) (2005). The Prose Edda. Penguin Classics. Penguin Books. ISBN 0-14-044755-5.
- Dronke, Ursula (Trans.) (1997). The Poetic Edda: Volume II: Mythological Poems. Oxford University Press. ISBN 0-19-811181-9.
- Davidson, H. R. Ellis (1990). Gods and Myths of Northern Europe. Penguin Books. ISBN 0-14-013627-4.
- Fazio, Michael W.; Moffett, Marian; Wodehouse, Lawrence (2003). A World History of Architecture. McGraw-Hill Professional. ISBN 0-07-141751-6.
- Bernharðsson, Haraldur (2007). "Old Icelandic Ragnarök and Ragnarökkr". In Nussbaum, Alan J. (ed.). Verba Docenti. Beech Stave Press. pp. 25–38. ISBN 978-0-9747927-3-6.
- Hopkins, Joseph S. (2014). "The 'Viking Apocalypse' of 22nd February 2014: An Analysis of the Jorvik Viking Center's Ragnarök and Its Media Reception". RMN Newsletter. 8. University of Helsinki: 7–12. ISSN 2324-0636.
- Hunter, John; Ralston, Ian (1999). The Archaeology of Britain: An Introduction from the Upper Palaeolithic to the Industrial Revolution. Routledge. ISBN 978-0-415-13588-7.
- Jansson, Sven B. (1987). Runes in Sweden. Stockholm, Gidlund. ISBN 91-7844-067-X.
- Larrington, Carolyne (Trans.) (1999). The Poetic Edda. Oxford World's Classics. ISBN 0-19-283946-2.
- Lindow, John (2001). Norse Mythology: A Guide to Gods, Heroes, Rituals, and Beliefs. Oxford University Press. ISBN 0-19-515382-0.
- MacLeod, Mindy; Mees, Bernard (2006). Runic Amulets and Magic Objects. Boydell Press. ISBN 1-84383-205-4.
- Mallory, J. P.; Adams, Douglas Q. (1997). Encyclopedia of Indo-European Culture. Taylor & Francis. ISBN 1-884964-98-2.
- Orchard, Andy (1997). Dictionary of Norse Myth and Legend. Cassell. ISBN 0-304-34520-2.
- Phillpotts, Bertha (1905). "Surt". Arkiv för Nordisk Filologi. 21: 14 ff.
- Pluskowski, Aleks (2004). "Apocalyptic Monsters: Animal Inspirations for the Iconography of Medieval Northern Devourers". In Bildhauer, Bettina; Mills, Robert (eds.). The Monstrous Middle Ages. University of Toronto Press. ISBN 0-8020-8667-5.
- Peterson, Lena; Elmevik, Lennart; Williams, Henrik, eds. (18 September 2004). Scandinavian Runic-text Database (2004 ed.). Department of Scandinavian Languages, Uppsala University.
- Simek, Rudolf (2007). Dictionary of Northern Mythology. translated by Angela Hall. D.S. Brewer. ISBN 978-0-85991-513-7.
- Wilson, David M. (1984). Anglo-Saxon Art: From the Seventh Century to the Norman Conquest. Overlook Press. ISBN 978-0-87951-976-6.
- Zoëga, Geir (2004) [1910]. A Concise Dictionary of Old Icelandic. University of Toronto. ISBN 0-8020-8659-4.
