= Surtr =

Norse mythical character

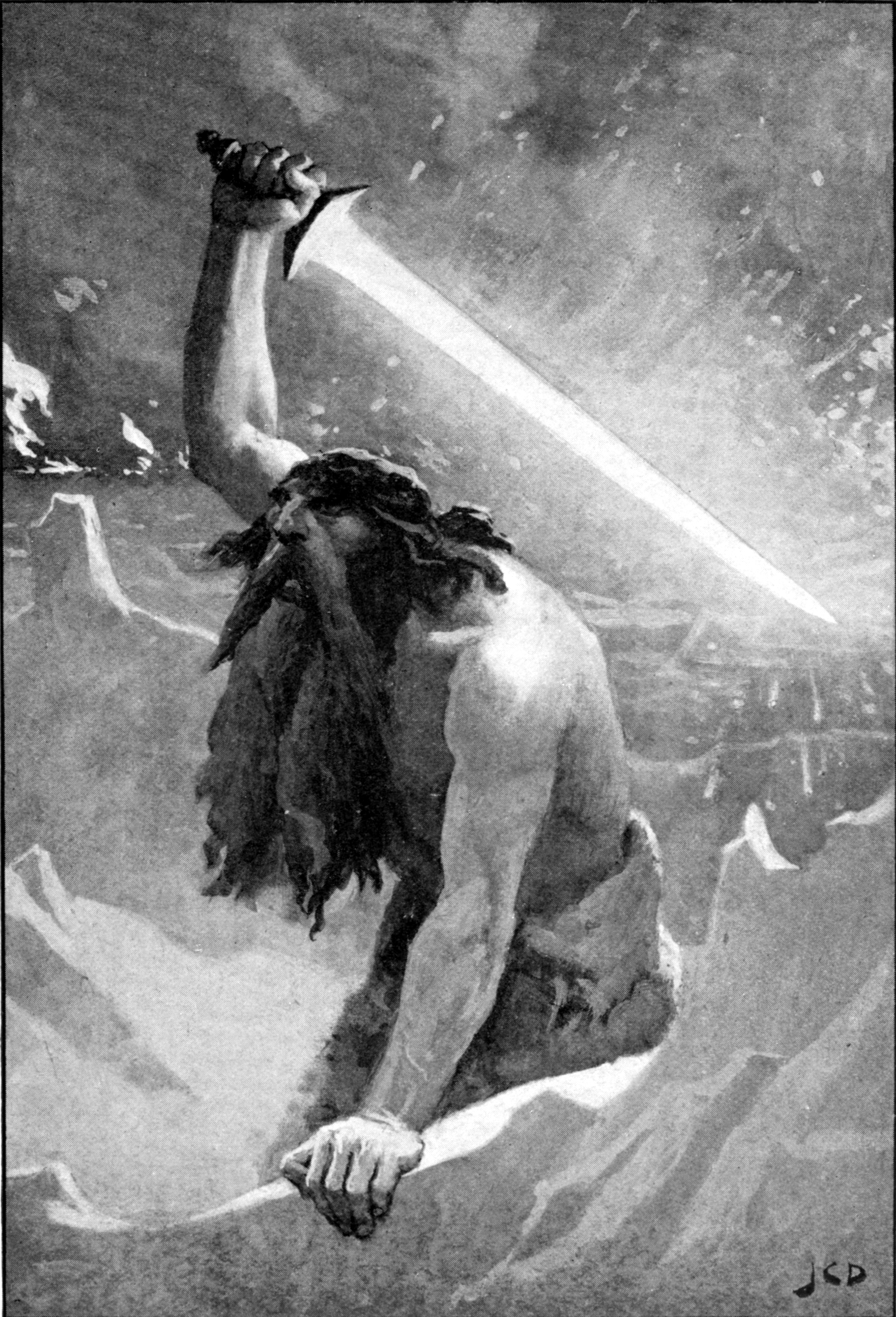
The Giant with the Flaming Sword (1909) by John Charles Dollman

In Norse mythology, Surtr (Old Norse "black" or more narrowly "swart", Surtur in modern Icelandic), also sometimes written Surt in English, is a jötunn; he further serves as the guardian of Muspelheim, which is one of the only two realms to exist before the beginning of time, alongside Niflheim. Surtr is attested in the Poetic Edda, compiled in the 13th century from earlier traditional sources, and the Prose Edda, written in the 13th century by Snorri Sturluson. In both sources, Surtr is foretold as being a major figure during the events of Ragnarök; carrying his bright sword, he will go to battle against the Æsir, he will battle the major god Freyr, and afterward the flames that he brings forth will engulf the Earth, killing all that remains of humanity down to two humans, Líf and Lífþrasir.

In a book from the Prose Edda additional information is given about Surtr, including that he is stationed guarding the frontier of the fiery realm Múspell, that he will lead "Múspell's sons" to Ragnarök, and that he will defeat Freyr. Surtr has been the subject of place names and artistic depictions, and scholars have proposed theories regarding elements of Surtr's descriptions and his potential origins.

== Attestations ==
=== Poetic Edda ===
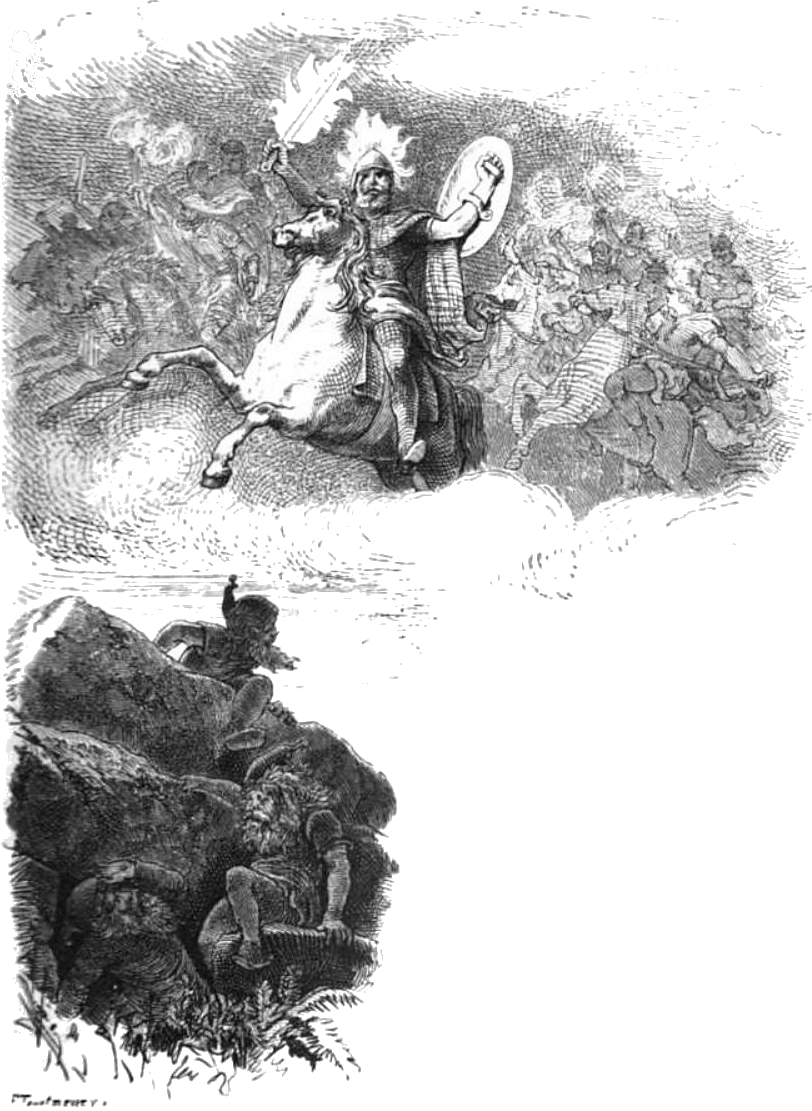
Surtr with the Flaming Sword (1882) by F. W. Heine, based on a plaster frieze designed by Friedrich Wilhelm Engelhard (1859)

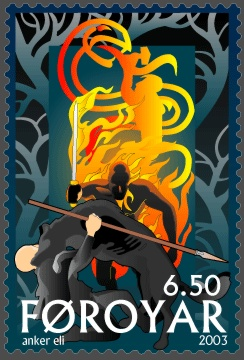
Surtr, From the Vøluspa series of Faroese postage stamps (2003) —Anker Eli Petersen

Surtr is mentioned twice in the poem Völuspá, where a völva divulges information to the god Odin. The völva says that, during Ragnarök, Surtr will come from the south with flames, carrying a very bright sword:

Old Norse:

Surtr ferr sunnan
með sviga lævi:
skinn af sverði
sól valtiva.

English:

Surtr moves from the south
with the scathe of branches:
there shines from his sword
the sun of Gods of the Slain.

Following this, the völva says that "stone peaks clash", "troll wives take to the road", "warriors tread the path from Hel", and the heavens "break apart". The next stanza relates that Odin is to be killed by the wolf Fenrir, and that Surtr will go to battle against "Beli's bane", a kenning for the god Freyr, who slew the jötunn Beli. No further detail is given about the fight between Surtr and Freyr in the poem. In the stanzas that follow, a number of gods and their opponents are described as doing battle at Ragnarök, and that the world will be consumed in flames, yet afterward a new world rises from the sea, fertile and teeming with life, and the surviving gods will meet again.

In the poem Vafþrúðnismál, the wise jötunn Vafþrúðnir poses the question to Odin (disguised as "Gagnráðr") "what the plain is called where in battle Surt and the sweet gods will meet". Odin responds that the "ordained field" is Vígríðr, and that it stretches "a hundred leagues" in every direction. Later in the poem, Odin, still disguised and now questioning Vafþrúðnir, asks which of the Æsir will "rule over the possessions of the gods when Surt's fire is slaked". Vafþrúðnir responds that, "when Surt's fire is slaked" the god Thor's sons Móði and Magni shall possess Thor's hammer Mjöllnir.

In the poem Fáfnismál, the hero Sigurd asks the mortally wounded dragon Fáfnir the name of the island where Surtr and the Æsir "will mingle sword-liquid together". Fáfnir says that the island is called Óskópnir, that all of the gods shall go there bearing spears, and that on their way there the bridge Bifröst will break beneath them, causing their horses to "flounder in the great river". The late Eddic poem Fjölsvinnsmál, stanza 24, contains the line "Surtur sinn mautu" or "surtur sinn mantu" according to the best manuscripts. The last two words, which are otherwise without meaning, are sometimes emended to "Sinmöru" and the entire phrase is taken to mean that Surtr has a female companion named Sinmara. Based on the same passage, Lee Hollander tentatively identifies Sinmara as Surt's wife, stating that she is "unknown elsewhere."

=== Prose Edda ===
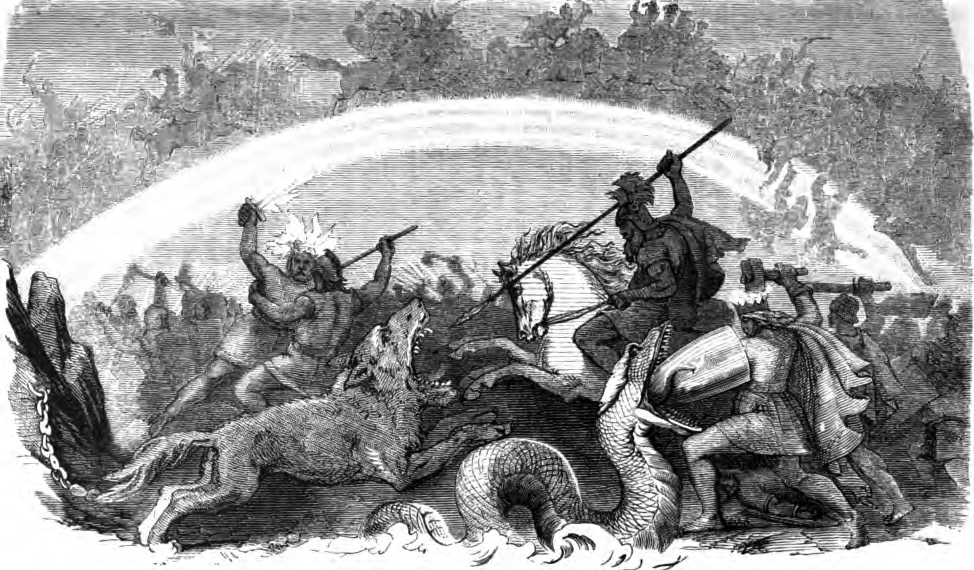
Battle of the Doomed Gods (1882) by Friedrich Wilhelm Heine

In chapter 4 of the Prose Edda book Gylfaginning, the enthroned figure of Third tells Gangleri (described as King Gylfi in disguise) about the location of Múspell. Third says that the bright and flaming region of Múspell existed prior to Niflheim, and it is impassable to those not native to the region. To defend Múspell, Surtr is stationed at its frontier. Third adds that Surtr has a flaming sword, and that "at the end of the world he will go and wage war and defeat all the gods and burn the whole world with fire". The stanza from Völuspá that foretells Surtr moving from the south is then quoted. In chapter 18, Gangleri asks what will protect the fair hall Gimlé "when Surtr's fire burns heaven and earth".

In chapter 51 of Gylfaginning, High describes the events of Ragnarök. High says that "amid this turmoil the sky will open and from it will ride the sons of Muspell. Surtr will ride in front, and both before and behind him there will be burning fire. His sword will be very fine. Light will shine from it more brightly than from the sun." High continues that when the sons of Múspell ride over the bridge Bifröst it will break, and that they will continue to the field of Vígríðr. The wolf Fenrir and the Midgard Serpent will also arrive there. By then, Loki will have arrived with "all of Hel's people", Hrym, and all of the frost jötnar; "but Muspell's sons will have their own battle array; it will be very bright". Further into the chapter, High describes that a fierce battle will erupt between these forces and the Æsir, and that during this, Surtr and Freyr will engage in battle "and there will be a harsh conflict before Freyr falls". High adds that the cause of Freyr's death will be that Freyr is lacking "the good sword" that he once gave his servant Skírnir.

As foretold by High further into chapter 51 Gylfaginning, once Heimdallr and Loki fight (and mutually kill one another), Surtr "will fling fire over the earth and burn the whole world". High quotes ten stanzas from Völuspá in support, and then proceeds to describe the rebirth and new fertility of the reborn world, and the survivors of Ragnarök, including various gods and the two humans named Líf and Lífthrasir that will have hid from "Surtr's fire" in the wood Hoddmímis holt.

In the Epilogue section of the book Skáldskaparmál, a euhemerized monologue states that "what they called Surt's fire was when Troy burned". In chapter 2, a work by the skald Eyvindr skáldaspillir is quoted that mentions "Surt's deep vales", using the name Surtr as a common noun for a jötunn, with "deep vales" referring to the depths of the mountains (specifically Hnitbjorg).

== Reception ==
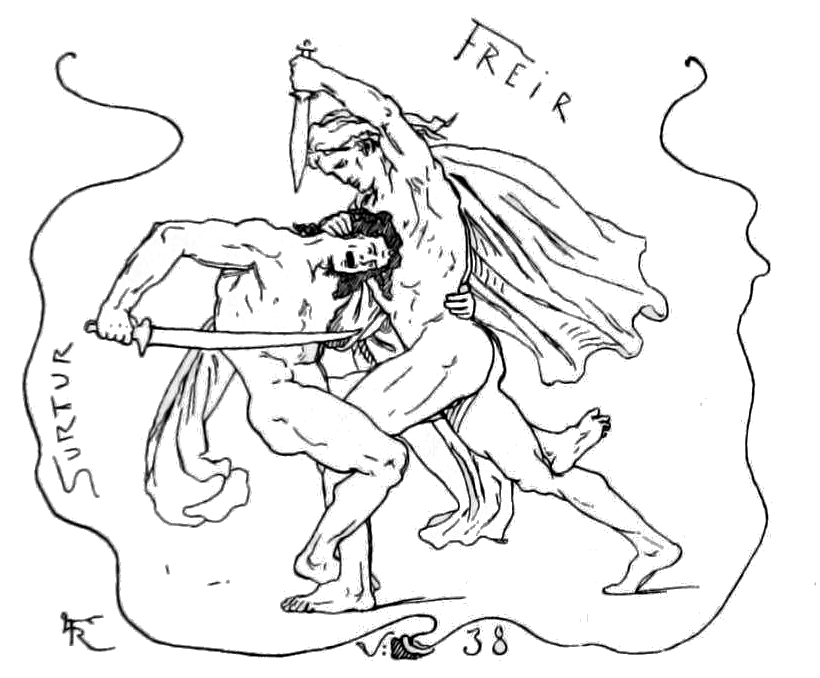
The battle between Surtr and Freyr at Ragnarök, illustration (1895) by Lorenz Frølich

Scholar Rudolf Simek theorizes that "the concept of Surtr is undoubtedly old", citing examples of Surtr being mentioned in works by the 10th century skalds Eyvindr skáldaspillir and Hallfreðr vandræðaskáld, in poems collected in the Poetic Edda, and that the name of the volcanic caves Surtshellir in western Iceland was already recorded in the Landnámabók manuscript. Simek notes that jötnar are usually described as living to the east in Old Norse sources, yet Surtr is described as being from the south, and that this "surely has to do with his association with fire and heat". Simek says that "in Iceland Surtr was obviously thought of as being a mighty giant who ruled the powers of (volcanic) fire of the Underworld", and Simek theorizes that the notion of Surtr as an enemy of the gods likely did not originate in Iceland. Simek compares Surtr to the jötnar Eldr, Eimnir, Logi, and Brandingi, noting that they all appear to be personifications of fire.

The scholar Bertha Phillpotts theorizes that the figure of Surtr was inspired by Icelandic eruptions, and that he was a volcano demon. Scholar Andy Orchard theorizes that the description of Surtr found in Gylfaginning "appears to owe something to biblical and patristic notions of the angel with a flaming sword who expelled Adam and Eve from paradise and who stands guard over the Garden of Eden." Scholar John Lindow states that the name Surtr may imply Surtr's charred appearance.

Richard Cole draws a comparison between Snorri's depiction of the sons of Muspell and the Red Jews motif. Cole writes that "Snorra Edda is closer to the Red Jews motif than it is to Vǫluspá", highlighting what he deems to be similarities between theProse Edda and the Red Jews motif where the Prose Edda differs from Völuspá.

== Surtshellir ==
The 12th-13th century Icelandic "Book of Settlements" (Landnámabók) describes the 150 km journey of a chieftain's son, Þorvaldur holbarki ("hollow throat") Þorðarson, through Iceland's interior to sing a poem of praise (a "drápa") – a ritual act – to the giant that lived inside "hellisins Surts", Surt's cave, which is called Surtshellir in modern Icelandic. Archaeological research inside the cave in 2001, 2012, and 2013 has shown that what was once theorized to be evidence of outlaws' activity in the cave – bones of sheep and oxen – instead documents evidence of Viking Age ritual activities undertaken inside the cave for 65–100 years prior to Iceland's conversion to Christianity around 1000 AD.

== Place names and modern influence ==
In modern Iceland, the notion of Surtr as a giant of fire lives on; Surtsey ("Surtr's island"), a volcanic island that appeared in 1963 in Vestmannaeyjar, Iceland, is named after Surtr much like Surtshellir.

The description found in Gylfaginning of Surtr guarding the frontier of Múspell is depicted in John Charles Dollman's painting The Giant with the Flaming Sword.

Surtur, a natural satellite of the planet Saturn, and Surt, a volcano on the planet Jupiter's moon Io, are both named after him. In 2019 the IAU named the star HAT-P-29 and its Jupiter-sized planet HAT-P-29b, respectively, Muspelheim and Surt, as a result of the NameExoWorlds 2019 campaign.

Surtr was adapted as a character by Marvel Comics, first appearing in Journey into Mystery #97 (October 1963). Surtur was important to the backstory in the animated film Thor: Tales of Asgard, before making a full appearance in the 2017 MCU film Thor: Ragnarok.
