= Naglfar =

Boat in Norse mythology

Naglfar
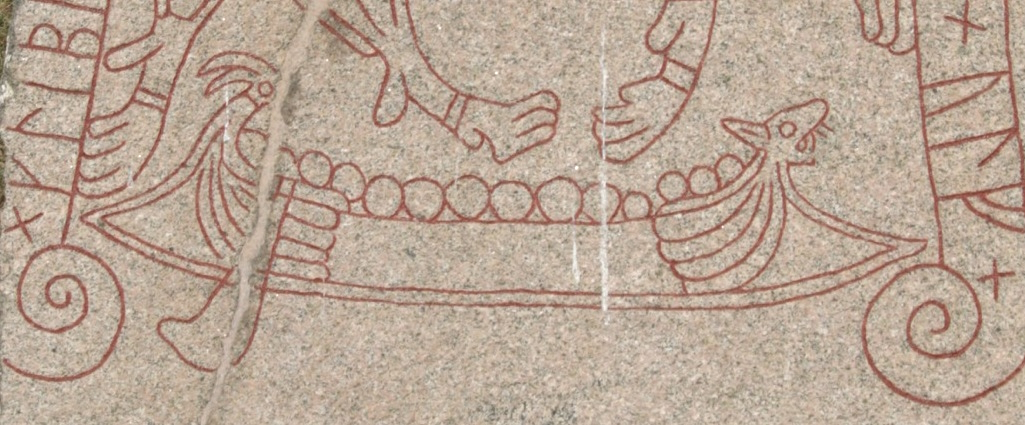
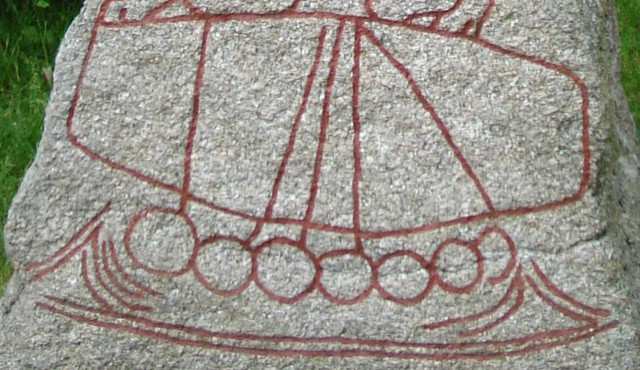
11th century stone carvings in Sweden, possibly depicting Naglfar during Ragnarök. Top image from the Tullstorp Runestone; bottom image from the Ledberg stone. Note the unconventional outward going bows.

In Norse mythology, Naglfar or Naglfari (Old Norse "nail farer") is a boat made entirely from the fingernails and toenails of the dead. During the events of Ragnarök, Naglfar is foretold to sail to Vígríðr, ferrying hordes of monsters that will do battle with the gods. Naglfar is attested in the Poetic Edda, compiled in the 13th century from earlier traditional sources, and the Prose Edda, also composed in the 13th century. The boat itself has been connected by scholars with a larger pattern of ritual hair and nail disposal among Indo-Europeans, stemming from Proto-Indo-European custom, and it may be depicted on the Tullstorp Runestone in Scania, Sweden.

== Etymology ==
Some dispute has waged over the etymology of Naglfar. In the late 19th century, Adolf Noreen proposed that nagl- here does not have its usual meaning of "nail", but, instead, is a variant of Old Norse nár (meaning "corpse") and ultimately derives from Proto-Indo-European *nok-w-i. Noreen claimed that the notion of Naglfar as a 'nail-ship' is due to a folk etymology; that elaboration on the folk etymology produced the concept of a "nail-ship".

However, Sigmund Feist (1909) rejects the theory on etymological grounds, as does Albert Morley Sturtevant (1951) on the grounds of major difficulties, and their points have led Bruce Lincoln (1977) to comment that "there is no reason whatever to contend that nagl- does not have its usual meaning of 'nail' and that Naglfar is anything other than the nail-ship, just as Snorri describes it." In addition, Lincoln finds the ship to be a part of a larger pattern of religious disposal and sacrifice of hair and nails among the Indo-Europeans (see below).

== Attestations ==
Naglfar is attested in both the Poetic Edda and the Prose Edda. In the Poetic Edda, Naglfar is solely mentioned in two stanzas found in the poem Völuspá. In the poem, a deceased völva foretells that the ship will arrive with rising waters, carrying Hrym and Loki and with them a horde of others:

Old Norse: Hrymr ekr austan, hefisk lind fyrir, snýsk Jörmungandr í jötunmóði; ormr knýr unnir, en ari hlakkar, slítr nái niðfölr, Naglfar losnar. Kjóll ferr austan, koma munu Múspells of lög lýðir, en Loki stýrir; fara fíflmegir með freka allir, þeim er bróðir Býleists í för.	Benjamin Thorpe translation: Hrym steers from the east, waters rise, the mundane snake is coiled in jötun-rage. The worm beats the water, and the eagle screams: the pale of beak tears carcasses; Naglfar is loosed. That ship fares from the east: come will Muspell's people o'er the sea, and Loki steers. The monster's kin goes all with the wolf; with them the brother of Byleist on their course.	Henry Adams Bellows translation: From the east comes Hrym with shield held high; In giant-wrath does the serpent writhe; O'er the waves he twists, and the tawny eagle Gnaws corpses screaming; Naglfar is loose. O'er the sea from the north there sails a ship With the people of Hel, at the helm stands Loki; After the wolf do wild men follow, And with them the brother of Byleist goes.

In the Prose Edda, Naglfar is mentioned four times. The ship is first mentioned in chapter 43 of Gylfaginning, where the enthroned figure of High notes that while Skíðblaðnir is the best ship—constructed with the finest skill—"the biggest ship is Naglfari, it belongs to Muspell".

In chapter 51, High foretells the events of Ragnarök. Regarding Naglfar, High says that after the stars disappear from the sky, the landscape will shake so severely that mountains fall apart, trees uproot, and all binds will snap, causing the wolf Fenrir to break free. After, the Midgardr Serpent Jörmungandr will fly into a rage and swim to the shore, causing the ocean to swell unto land. Naglfar, too, will be break free from its moorings. High describes the composition of Naglfar as that of the untrimmed nails of the dead, and warns about burying the dead with untrimmed nails, stating that "the ship is made of dead people's nails, and it is worth taking care lest anyone die with untrimmed nails, since such a person contributes much material to the ship Naglfar which gods and men wish would take a long time to finish". High adds that the ship will be captained by the jötunn Hrym, and that Naglfar will be carried along with the surging waters of the flood. Further in chapter 51, High quotes the Völuspá stanzas above that references the ship.

Naglfar receives a final mention in the Prose Edda in Skáldskaparmál, where it is included among a list of ships.

== Tullstorp Runestone ==
If the images on the Tullstorp Runestone are correctly identified as being from Ragnarök, then Naglfar is shown below the monstrous wolf Fenrir. It has been pointed out that the ship image has beakheads both fore and aft unlike any known Viking ship, and is thus likely to be a symbolic ship.

The inscription mentions the name Ulfr ("wolf"), and the name Kleppir/Glippir. The last name is not fully understood, but may have represented Glæipiʀ which is similar to Gleipnir which was the rope with which the Fenrir wolf was bound. The two male names may have inspired the theme depicted on the runestone.

== Interpretations and theories ==
In his study of treatment of hair and nails among the Indo-Europeans, Bruce Lincoln compares Snorri's Prose Edda comments about nail disposal to an Avestan text, where Ahura Mazdā warns that daevas and xrafstras will spring from hair and nails that lay without correct burial, noting their conceptual similarities. Lincoln comments that "the specific image of Naglfar, the 'Nail-ship', is undoubtedly specific to the Germanic world, although it does date to an ancient date within that area. But the basic idea on which it is based – that the improper disposal of hair and nails is an act which threatens the well-being of the cosmos – does ascend to the Indo-European period, as can be seen from comparisons [with Iranian myth]."

== Cultural influence ==
The ship appears in the videogame The Witcher 3: Wild Hunt and in its spin-off game Gwent as the vehicle the evil Wild Hunt uses to travel between worlds.

The ship also appears in the videogame World of Warcraft in the Legion expansion. In the dungeon, Maw of Souls, players completed the last half of the 2 part dungeon on the Naglfar. This culminates as you defeat the final boss of the dungeon, Helya.

In EVE Online, the Naglfar is a dreadnought capital ship.

Naglfar appears as the Realmship of Water in Final Fantasy XIV: Evercold.

The magic of the boss character Lyon in Fire Emblem: The Sacred Stones is named Naglfar.

John Myers Myers made Naglfar the name of the ship sunk in the opening paragraphs of Silverlock, setting his hero loose from the modern world to traipse his adventurous way into realms of myth and legend.

Naglfar is the name of a Swedish black metal band.

Naglfar is the central focus of the novel The Ship of the Dead by Rick Riordan, where the main characters go on a quest to prevent its launching.

== See also ==
- Naglfari, depending on manuscript, a figure with a similar or identical name

== General and cited references ==
- Bellows, Henry Adams (transl.) (2004) [1923]. The Poetic Edda. Dover (reprint of American-Scandinavian Foundation edition). ISBN 0486437108.
- Crumlin-Pedersen, Ole & Thye, Birgitte Munch (eds.) (1995). The Ship as Symbol in Prehistoric and Medieval Scandinavia: Papers from an International Research Seminar at the Danish National Museum, Copenhagen, 5th-7th May 1994. Nationalmuseet. ISBN 87-89384-01-6
- Faulkes, Anthony (Trans.) (1995). Edda. Everyman. ISBN 0-460-87616-3
- Krappe, Alexander Haggerty (2003) [1930]. Science of Folklore. Reprint. Kessinger Publishing. ISBN 0-7661-5813-6.
- Lincoln, Bruce (1977). "Treatment of Hair and Fingernails among the Indo-Europeans" from History of Religions, Vol. 16, No. 4, The Mythic Imagination (May, 1977), pages 351—362. University of Chicago Press.
- Lindow, John (2001). Norse Mythology: A Guide to the Gods, Heroes, Rituals, and Beliefs. Oxford University Press. ISBN 0-19-515382-0.
- Merrony, Mark (2004). The Vikings: Conquerors, Traders and Pirates. Periplus. ISBN 1-902699-54-8.
- McKinnell, John (2005). Meeting the Other in Norse Myth and Legend. D. S. Brewer. ISBN 1-84384-042-1.
- Thorpe, Benjamin (Trans.) (1906). The Elder Eddas of Saemund Sigfusson, Younger Eddas of Snorre Sturleson. Norrœna Society.
