= Vígríðr =

Field foretold to host the final battle between during Ragnarök

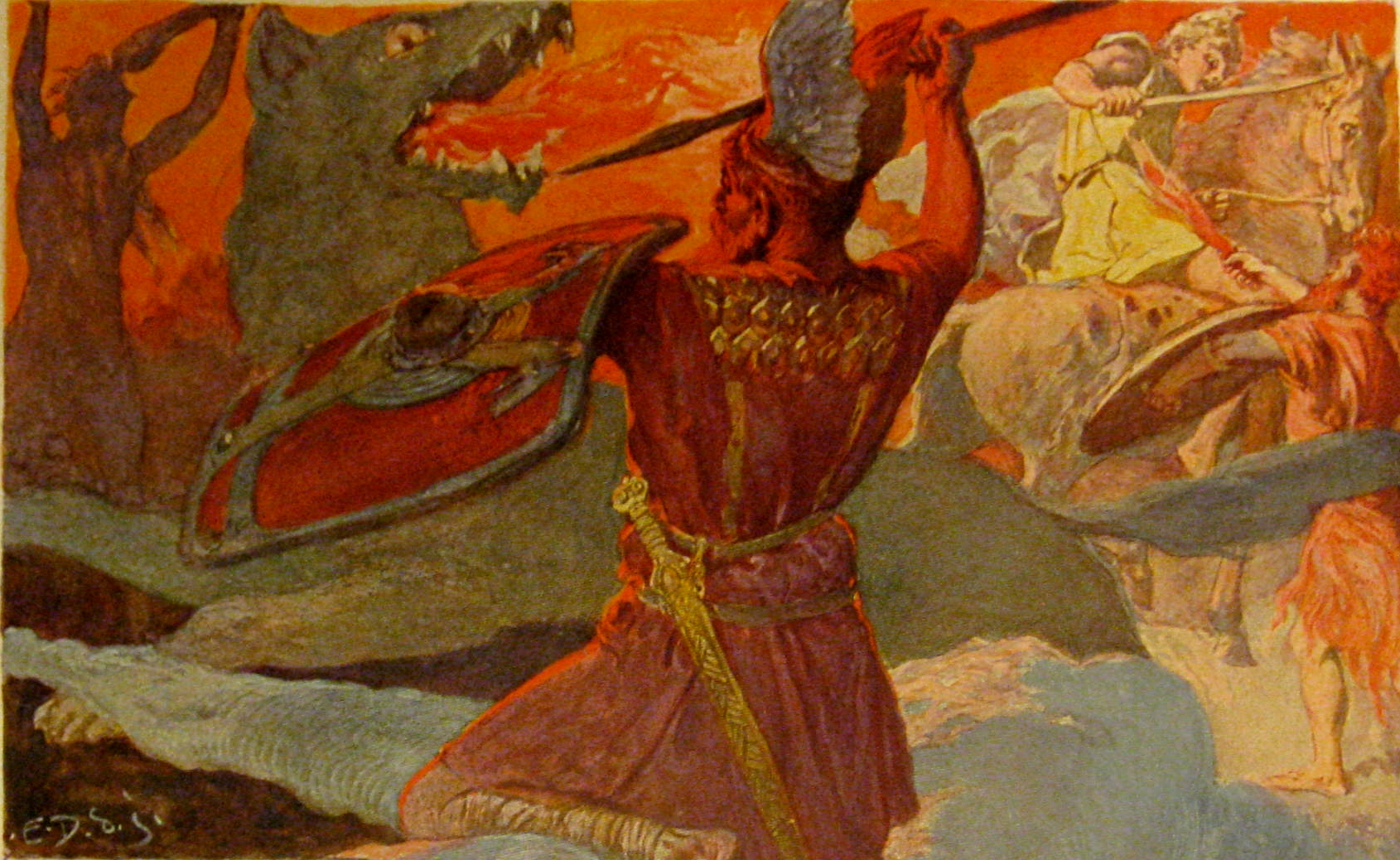
The god Odin battles the wolf Fenrir while other deities and their combatants fight in the background on the field Vígríðr in an illustration (1905) by Emil Doepler.

In Norse mythology, Vígríðr or Óskópnir is a large field foretold to host a battle between the forces of the gods and the forces of Surtr as part of the events of Ragnarök. The field is attested in the Poetic Edda, compiled in the 13th century from earlier traditional material, and in the Prose Edda, written by Snorri Sturluson in the 13th century. The Poetic Edda briefly mentions the field as where the two forces will battle, whereas the Prose Edda features a fuller account, foretelling that it is the location of the future death of several deities (and their enemies) before the world is engulfed in flames and reborn.

== Etymology ==
The Old Norse place name Vígríðr means "battle-surge" or "place on which battle surges". The name Vígríðr is sometimes modernly anglicized as Vigrid, Vigrith, or Wigrid. The etymology of the name Óskópnir is a matter of scholarly debate, but has been proposed as meaning "the (not yet) created", "not made" or "mismade".

== Attestations ==
=== Poetic Edda ===
In the Poetic Edda poem Vafþrúðnismál, the god Odin, disguised as "Gagnráðr" faces off with the wise jötunn Vafþrúðnir in a battle of wits. Among numerous other questions, Vafþrúðnir asks Odin to tell him what the name of the plain is where the gods and Surtr will meet. Odin responds that the name of the plain is Vígríðr, and that the size of the field is 100 leagues in every direction:

Benjamin Thorpe translation: Vafthrûdnir. Tell me, Gagnrâd! since on the floor thou wilt prove they proficiency, how that plain is called, where in fight shall meet Surt and the gentle Gods? Gagnrâd. Vigrid the plain is called, where in fight shall meet Surt and the gentle Gods; a hundred rasts it is on every side. That plain is to them decreed.	Henry Adams Bellows translation: Vafthrudnir spake: "Speak forth now, Gagnrath, if there from the floor Thou wouldst thy wisdom make known: What name has the field where in fight shall meet Surt and the gracious gods?" Othin spake: "Vigrith is the field where in fight shall meet Surt and the gracious gods; A hundred miles each way does it measure, And so are its boundaries set."

In his translation notes for these stanzas, Henry Adams Bellows notes that "a hundred miles" is a "general phrase for a vast distance".

In the Poetic Edda poem Fáfnismál, the dying wyrm Fáfnir is asked by the hero Sigurd what the name of the island is where Surtr and the gods will battle is called. Fáfnir replies that the island is called Óskópnir.

=== Prose Edda ===
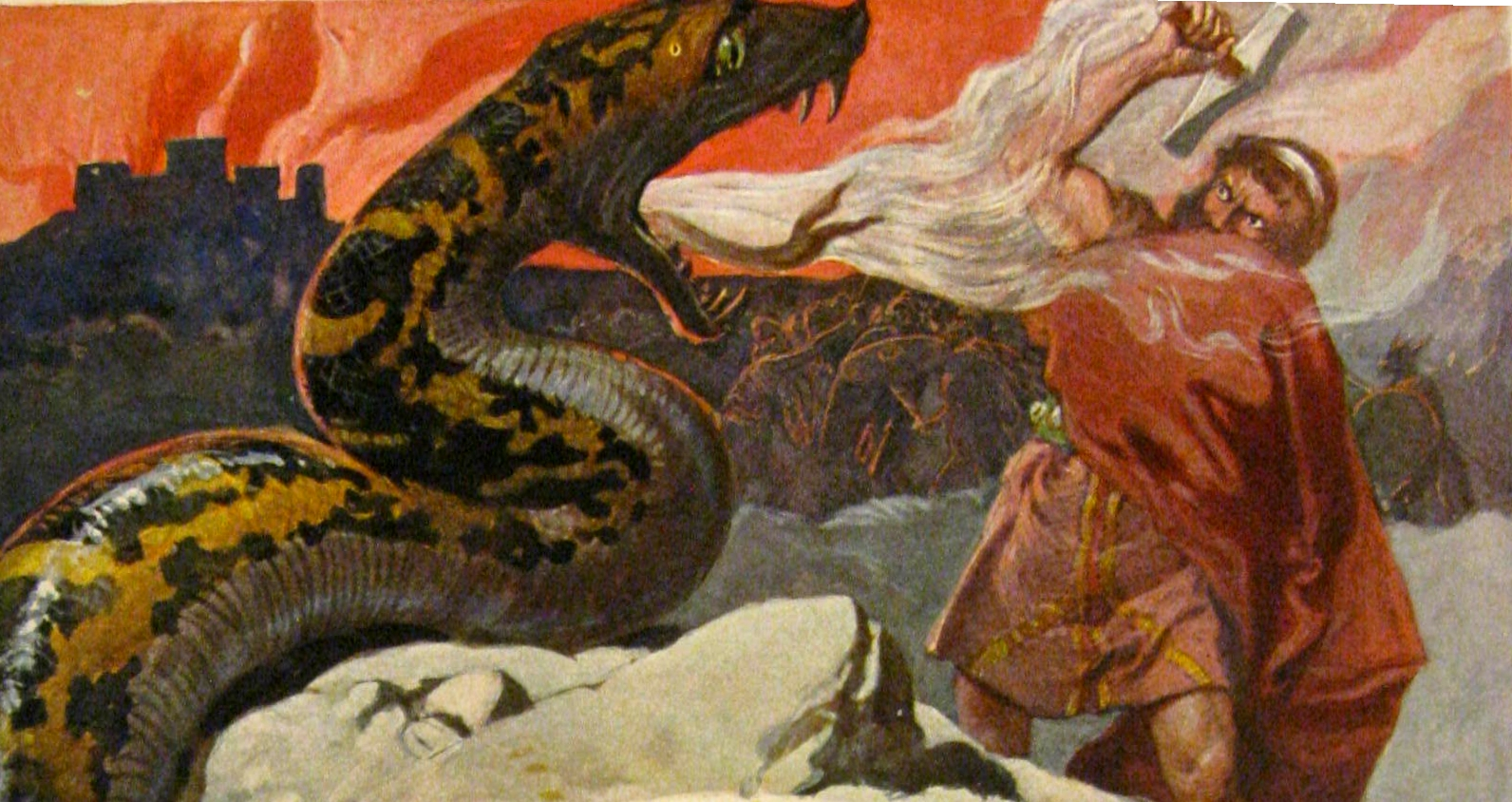
The battle at Vígríðr raging behind them, the serpent Jörmungandr confronts the god Thor in an illustration (1905) by Emil Doepler.

In the Prose Edda book Gylfaginning, the enthroned figure of High foretells the events of Ragnarök. High says the Muspell's forces will gather at the field Vígríðr, a field which he adds is "a hundred leagues in each direction". Then the monstrous wolf Fenrir and the immense serpent Jörmungandr will arrive. By that time, the jötunn Hrym with all of the frost-jötnar and Loki with "all Hel's people" will have also arrived.

As these forces gather, the god Heimdallr will stand and blow into his horn, Gjallarhorn, which will awaken the gods. The gods will meet and hold a thing. Odin will ride to the well Mímisbrunnr and will consult Mímir on behalf of himself and his people. Yggdrasil, the cosmological tree, will shiver and all beings will be fearful. The gods and the einherjar will don their war gear and advance to Vígríðr. Odin, wearing a golden helmet, a coat of mail, and brandishing his spear Gungnir, will ride in the front.

Odin will make directly for Fenrir and the god Thor, by Odin's side, will be unable to help him because he will be fighting Jörmungandr. The god Freyr will engage the fiery being Surtr and, since Freyr lacks the sword he gave his servant Skírnir, Freyr will fall after a rough struggle. The god Tyr will fight the hound Garmr and the two will kill one another. Thor will kill the serpent Jörmungandr but after nine steps will collapse to the ground, dead from Jörmungandr's venom. Fenrir will eat Odin, but immediately after Odin's son Víðarr will come forward and set his foot on to the wolf's lower jaw, and grasp its upper jaw, ripping its mouth apart, killing it. Loki and Heimdallr will kill one another and, after their death, Surtr will spray fire over the earth and burn the entire world.

Later in the same chapter, High quotes Odin's response from the above-mentioned chapter of Vafþrúðnismál.
