= Brimir =

Nordic mythical figure

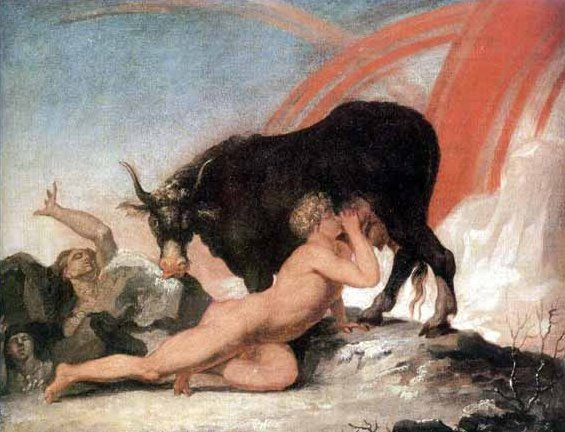
1790 painting of the Jotun Ymir suckling on a goat

In Norse mythology, Brimir is possibly another name for the jötunn Ymir and also a name of a hall for the souls of the virtuous following the end-time conflict of Ragnarök.

In the Gylfaginning section of the Prose Edda Brimir refers to a hall in the heavens for good souls following Ragnarok where "plenty of good drink" will be available for those who take pleasure in it.

In stanza 9 of Völuspá, the first poem of the Poetic Edda, Brimir and Blain are both interpreted as alternate names for Ymir, although distinction between origin and issue is often difficult to discern in Norse mythology:

"Then all the Powers went to the thrones of fate,
the sacrosanct gods, and considered this:
who should form the lord of the dwarfs
out of Brimir's blood and from Blain's limbs?"

— Larrington trans.

Quoted by Snorri in Gylfaginning, he expands upon this and tells us that the dwarves were created from the dead flesh of Ymir whose body was used by Odin and his brothers to form the earth ("Brimir's blood" referring to the sea and "Blain's limbs" referring to the mountains that were made from his bones).

Stanza 37 of the same poem mentions Brimir as the name of a jötunn who may or may not be Ymir as the owner of a beer hall:

"To the north there stood on Dark-of-moon Plains
a hall of gold of the lineage of Sindri
and another stood on Never-cooled Plain,
the beer-hall of the giant who is called Brimir."

— Larrington trans.

Snorri used this stanza as his basis for Brimir as a hall in the afterlife in Gylfaginning but whether the two residences are identical is uncertain.

== See also ==
- Death in Norse paganism#Afterlives and rebirth - Further discussion on the role of the potential afterlife in pre-Christian beliefs
