= Surtshellir =

Lava cave in western Iceland

Coordinates: 64°47′03″N 20°43′40″W

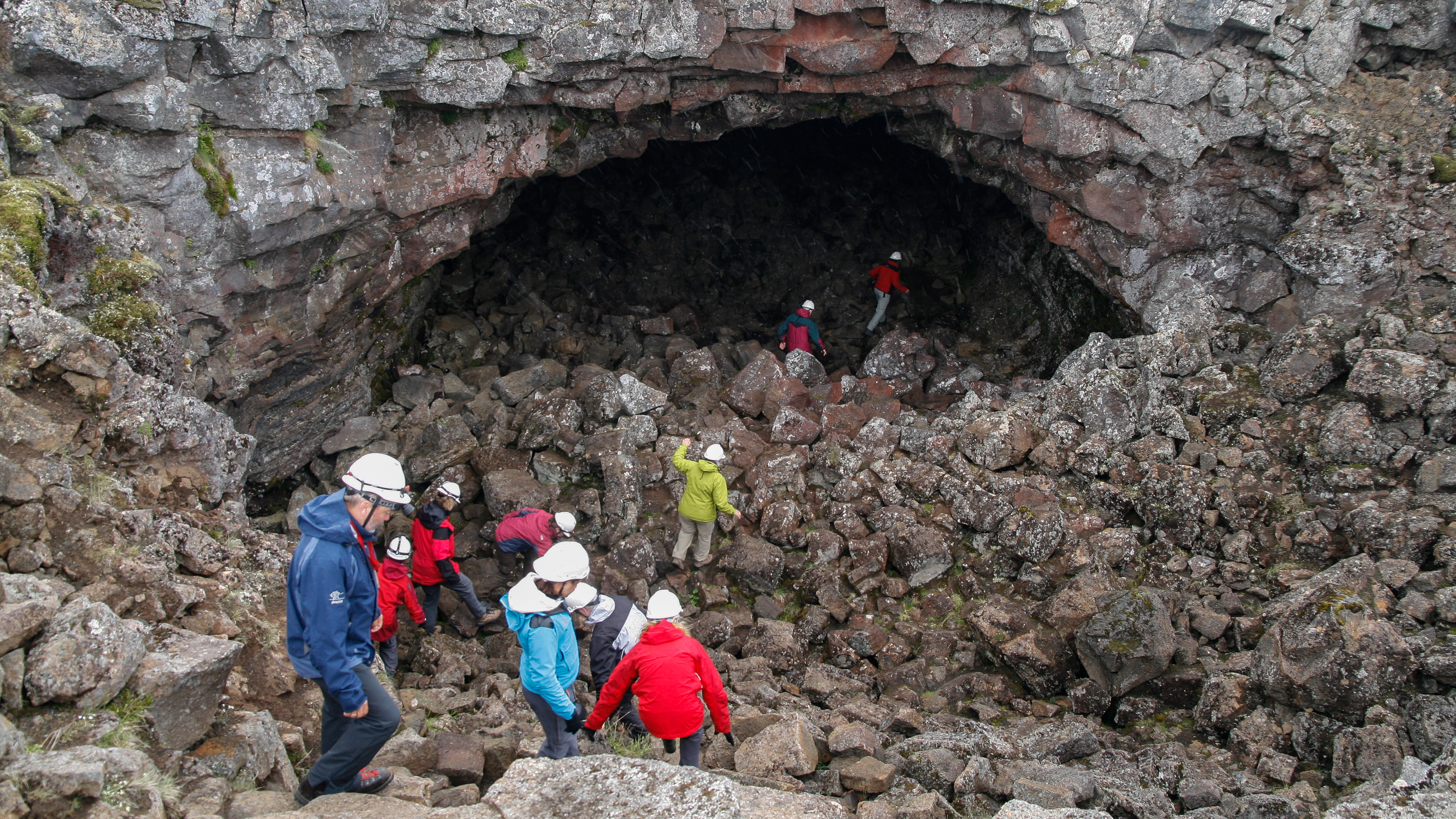
One of four entrances to the Surtshellir lava tube in the Hallmundarhraun lava field.

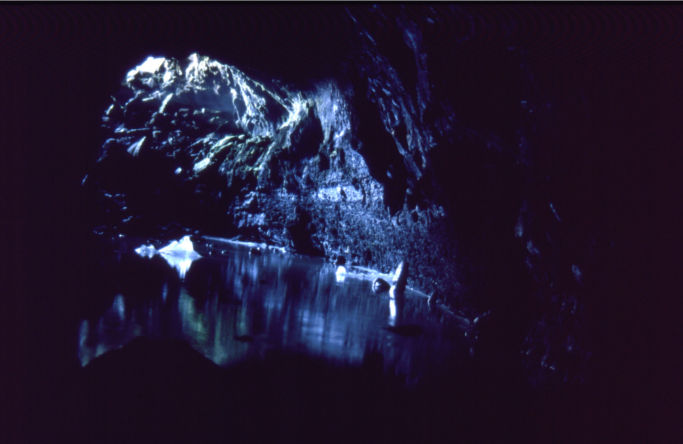
Looking up towards the fourth (lowest and farthest west) entrance to Surtshellir, seen from within the section of the cave called Íshellir (ice-cave). The white slab is ice, which was preserved into summertime.

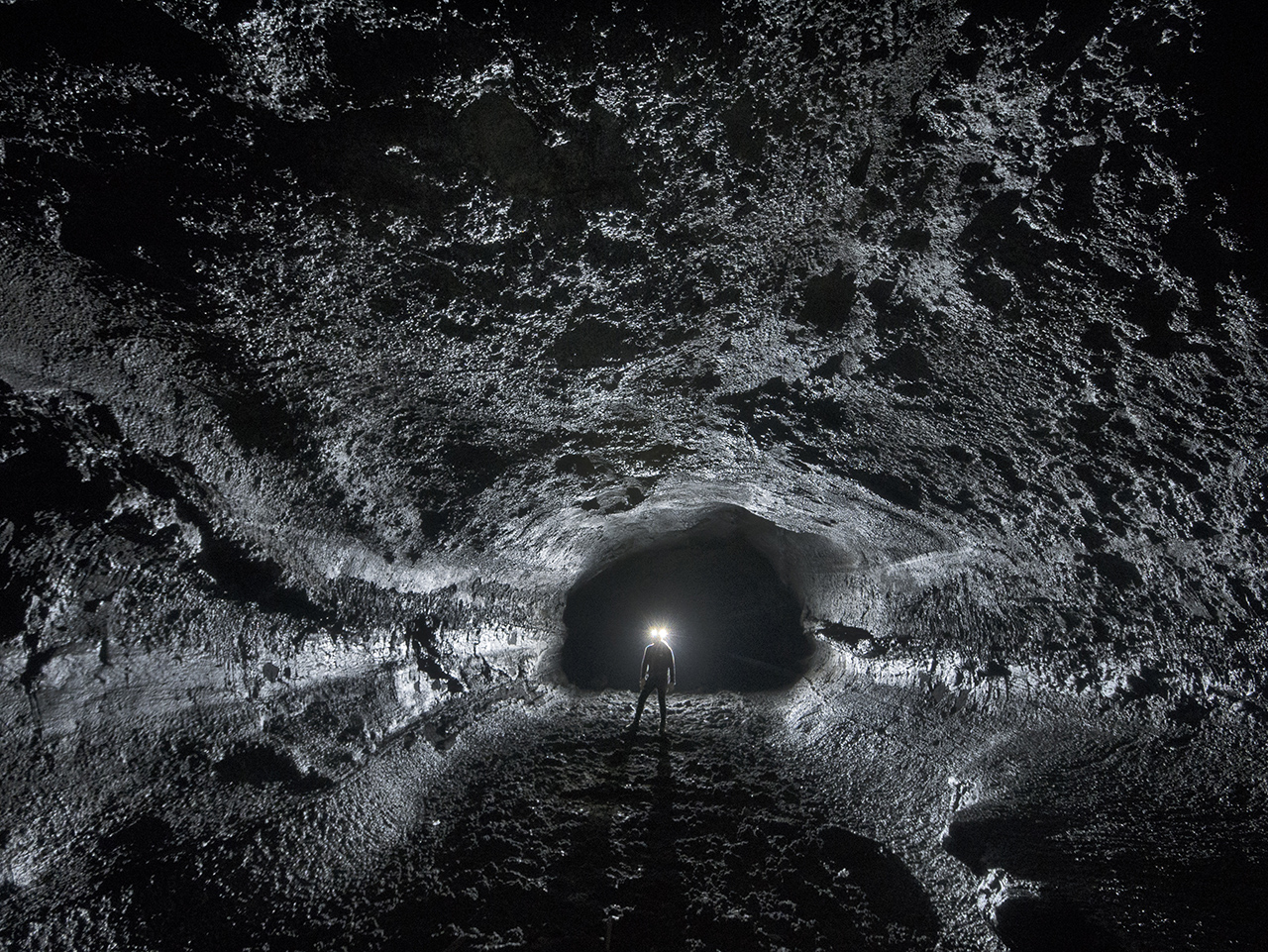
Typical passage shapes in the Surtshellir-Stefanshellir lava tube system, showing intact walls and pahoehoe floors

Surtshellir (Icelandic pronunciation: [ˈsʏr̥(t)sˌhɛtlɪr̥]) is a lava cave located in western Iceland, around 60 km from the settlement of Borgarnes. Approximately a mile in length, it is one of the longest such caves in the country. It was the first known lava tube in the world, at least by modern speleologists, and remained the longest known lava tube until the end of the 19th century. While mentioned in the medieval historical-geographical work Landnámabók, Eggert Ólafsson was the first to give a thorough documentation of the cave in his 1750 travels of the region. It is named after the fire giant Surtr, a prominent figure in Norse mythology, who is prophesied to one day engulf the world in the fire of his flaming sword.

Surtshellir was formed as a lava tube in a massive, effusive, shield-volcano eruption at the northern end of the Prestahnúkur volcanic system. At least three and possibly four vents opened on the edge of Langjökull glacier during this long-lived eruption, which has been dated to the first decades of Iceland's settlement (c. 880–920). Ultimately, the eruption covered 240 km^{2} (90 mi^{2}) of once fertile grazing and settled land beneath sheets of lava 20 meters thick, or more. Surtshellir is one of 20 known caves in the Hallmundarhraun lava field that once carried magma from the vents to the farthest ends of the lava field, more than 50 km to the west. Eight of these (including Viðgelmir and Hallmundarhellir) are known to contain archaeological remains of varying age; Surtshellir's are the most extensive.

Being of volcanic origin, the walls of the interior are composed of vitrified layers of magma and basalt. The roof of the cave is about 10 metres high at the highest point, and the tunnels are around 15m broad at their greatest width. The floor of the lowest and westernmost part of the cave, called Íshellir ("Ice Cave"), is covered in a perpetual sheeting of ice and large ice speleothems are common within the cave. The height of the roof is highly variable throughout the cave, and at the latter extremities is only 2–4 m. Four massive openings in the roof have formed since at least the 17th century and blocks of lava fallen from the cave's ceiling cover much of the floor in the rest of the cave, documenting the cave's slow collapse.

It was long thought that the cave and the passages that intersect the cave's main tunnel were used as hideouts for outlaws and bandits who would steal livestock from the farmers and shepherds living in the area. However, the earliest reference to the cave by name, in the 12th-13th century Icelandic "Book of Settlements" (Landnámabók) describes the 150 km journey of a chieftain's son, Þorvaldur holbarki ("hollow throat") Þorðarson, through Iceland's interior to sing a poem of praise (a "drápa") – a ritual act – to the giant that lived inside "hellisins Surts", Surt's cave. Archaeological research inside the cave in 2001, 2012, and 2013 has shown that remains once thought to be evidence of outlaws' activity in the cave – including bones of domestic sheep/goats, horses, pigs, cattle, and possibly fowl – instead document evidence of Viking Age ritual activities undertaken inside the cave for 65–100 years prior to Iceland's conversion to Christianity around AD 1000.

The cave itself has long been a source of superstition for the Icelanders inhabiting the nearby farms. Eggert Ólafsson recalled having been warned by locals of the ghosts that were said to dwell within and was assured that his party would be killed by them if they were to enter. Surtr himself was said to have once lived within the cave and, being a fire giant, to have been the cause of the cave's creation.

Surtshellir is in close proximity to another lava cave, Stefánshellir, with which it forms a complex referred to as the Surtshellir-Stefánshellir system.

Both caves were profusely decorated with lavacicles and lava stalagmites in the past, based on survey of the broken stubs and shattered pieces of these formations. This has resulted from both deliberate vandalism from souvenir hunters and from high traffic through the caves with visitors bumping into and breaking the fragile formations. This is an unfortunate occurrence in many Icelandic caves.
