= Ífingr =

Mythological river

In Norse mythology, Ífingr (sometimes anglicised as "Ifing") is a river that separates Asgard, the realm of the Æsir, from Jötunheimr, the land of jötnar, according to stanza 16 of the poem Vafþrúðnismál from the Poetic Edda:

Ifing the river is called, which divides the earth
between the sons of giants and the gods;
freely it will flow through all time,
ice never forms on the river.

— Larrington trans.

John Lindow in Norse Mythology (2001) states in reference to Ifing that a river on which ice will never form is one that runs swiftly and therefore is extremely difficult to ford (thus forming an effective barrier between the worlds of gods and jötnar).

== See also ==
- Elbląg, a river sometimes known as Ilfing
