= Okolnir =

Place in Norse mythology

In Norse mythology, Okolnir ("Never Cold") is a plain that is located in the hall of Brimir and mentioned only in stanza 37 of the poem Völuspá from the Poetic Edda. The location of this plain is unstated in the poem.
