= Hrymr =

Norse mythical character

Hrymr (also Hrym or Rym) is a jötunn in Norse mythology. During the final battle of Ragnarök, Hrym will bring with him all the legions of the jötnar (giants) toward the field of Vígríðr to confront the Æsir (gods).

== Name ==
The etymology of the Old Norse name Hrymr is unclear. Andy Orchard has proposed the meaning 'decrepit'. Jan de Vries argues that a relation with hrumr ('weak, fragile') is semantically questionable.

== Attestations ==
In Völuspá (Prophecy of the Völva), Hrymr plays a major role in the apocalyptic events of Ragnarök.

Hrym drives from the east, heaves his shield before him,
the great serpent writhes in giant rage;
the serpent churns the waves, the eagle shrieks in anticipation
pale-beaked he rips the corpse, Naglfar breaks free.

— Völuspá, 47, trans. C. Larrington, 1996.

In Gylfaginning (The Beguiling of Gylfi, 51), he is depicted as the captain of Naglfar, the ship that will ferry the enemies of the gods during Ragnarök, directly contradicting the version of Völuspá where it is the god Loki who will steer the ship.

There is a giant called Hrym who will captain Naglfar (...) Then there will also arrive there Fenriswolf and the Midgard serpent. By then Loki will also have arrived there and Hrym and with him all the frost-giants, but with Loki will be all Hel's people.

— Gylfaginning, 51, trans. A. Faulkes, 1987.
