= Hræsvelgr =

Norse mythical character

Hræsvelgr (Old Norse) is a jötunn in the form of an eagle in Norse mythology. He sits at the northern edge of the heavens, and all the winds are created by him flapping his wings.

== Etymology ==
The Old Norse name Hræsvelgr has been translated as 'corpse-swallower', or as 'shipwreck-current'.

Hræsvelgr's name is sometimes anglicised as Hraesvelgr, Hresvelgr, Hraesveglur, or Hraesvelg. The common Danish form is Hræsvælg and the common Swedish form is Räsvelg.

== Attestation ==
In Vafþrúðnismál (The Lay of Vafþrúðnir), Odin questions the wise jötunn Vafþrúðnir about the origin of the wind, and the jötunn answers:

He is called Hræsvelg,
who sits at heaven’s end,
a giant, in the shape of an eagle;
from his wings
they say the wind comes over all people.

— Vafþrúðnismál, 37, trans. J. Lindow, 2002.

This stanza is paraphrased by Snorri Sturluson in Gylfaginning (The Beguiling of Gylfi), when Hárr answers the same question, that time asked by Gangleri (Gylfi in disguise). Snorri adds that Hræsvelgr sits at the north end of heaven, and that winds originate from under his gigantic eagle's wings when he spreads them for flight.
