= Lævateinn =

Sword of Loki from Norse myth

In Norse mythology, Lævateinn is a weapon crafted by Loki mentioned in the Poetic Edda poem Fjölsvinnsmál. The name Lævateinn does not appear in the original manuscript reading, but is an emendation from Hævateinn made by Sophus Bugge and others.

The weapon is needed to slay the rooster Viðofnir atop the Mímameiðr tree in order for the seeker to achieve his quest, or so replies the wise porter Fjölsviðr, the titular character of the poem.

Lævateinn has variously been asserted to be a dart (or some projectile weapon), or a sword, or a wand, by different commentators and translators. It is glossed as literally meaning a "wand causing damage" by several sources, yet some of these same sources claim simultaneously that the name is a kenning for sword. Others prefer to regard it as a magic wand (seiðr staff); but the suggestion that it may be equated to the mistletoe (mistilteinn) dart that killed Baldur has met with opposition.

== Attestation ==
Lævateinn is the only weapon capable of defeating the cockerel Viðofnir, as explained by Fiölsvith "the very wise" porter in the poem Fjölsvinnsmál. Lopt, the sword's maker, refers to Loki.

=== Name and meanings ===
Hævateinn, the untampered form of the weapon's name as occurs in manuscript, has been glossed as "sure-striking javelin" by Árni Magnússon in 1787, (Note: Latin: spiculum in feriendo certum.) and rendered "an arrow's name /That never disappoints the aim" by A. S. Cottle in 1797 (while in the foregoing question it is asked, "could one hope.. To reach Vidofner with a dart?").

Lævateinn, the emendation made by changing the first letter from H to L, was proposed by Sophus Bugge in 1860/1861, later printed in Bugge's edition of the Poetic Edda (1867), and construed to mean 'Wounding Wand', or 'damage twig', or "Wand-of-Destruction".

The Lævateinn or læ-wand can have three possible senses of meaning, and the latter three English glosses exploit only one of them. The three meanings of læ (the nominative case of læva) are: "cunning", "deception", and "injury". The weapon's name is glossed as "wand of non deceit" in passing without further explanation by Einar Ólafur Sveinsson.

=== Fjölsvinnsmál ===
The weapon is mentioned briefly thus in the poem Fjölsvinnsmál:

Segþv mer þat, Fjölsviþr!
Hvart ſe vapna nockvt
þat er knegi Viþofnir for
Hníga á heljar ſjót?“

Hæva-teinn heitir hann;
Enn hann gerþi Loptr Rúinn
Fyr ná-grindor neþan,
I ſæg iárnkeri liggr han
Hia Sin-mörv;
Oc halda njarþ-láſar nío.}

— Fjölsvinnsmál, str. 26–27. Árni Magnússon pub. (1787)
Translation:

Tell me, Fiölsvith! etc.
whether there be any weapon,
before which Vidofnir may
fall to Hel´s abode?

Hævatein the twig is named,
and Lopt plucked it,
down by the gate of Death.
In an iron chest it lies
with Sinmoera,
and is with nine strong locks secured.

— Benjamin Thorpe translation

Bugge proposed that this poem Fjölsvinnsmál should be treated as Part II of Svipdagsmál (sequel to Part I Grógaldr), and the sword's name was emended to Lævateinn by him.

The poem underwent further modifications. The phrase "í sæg iárnkeri" ('placed in an iron vase') (Note: Or, if parsed as "sæ-gjarn" becomes construable as 'sea lover'.) was modified by Hjalmar Falk to "í Lægjarns keri", where Lægjarn denoted 'Lover of Ill', a nickname of Loki.

Vindkaldr kvað:
Segðu mér þat, Fjölsviðr!
er ek þik spyrja mun
ok ek vilja vita:
hvárt sé vápna nökkut,
þat er knegi Viðofnir fyr
hníga á Heljar sjöt?

Fjölsviðr kvað:
Lævateinn hann heitir,
en hann gerði Loptr rýninn
fyr nágrindr neðan;
í seigjárnkeri [í Lægjarns keri]
liggr hann hjá Sinmöru,
ok halda njarðlásar níu.

— Fjölsvinnsmál, str. 25–26. Sophus Bugge ed. (1867) (Note: with an emendation by Falk shown in brackets)
Translation:

Svipdag spake:
"Now answer me, Fjolsvith, the question I ask,
For now the truth would I know:
What weapon can send Vithofnir to seek
The house of Hel below?"

Fjolsvith spake:
"Lævatein is there, that Lopt with runes
Once made by the doors of death;
In Lægjarn[Loki]'s (Note: The original text reads Sægjarn "Sea Lover", emended to Lægjarn "Lover of Ill" by Hjalmar Falk, and construed as a nickname for Loki.) chest by Sinmora lies it,
And nine locks fasten it firm".

— Henry Adams Bellows translation

== Theories ==
The Laeva- stem of the weapon's name is considered the genitive form of Lae-, as occurs in Loki's nickname Lægjarn ("Lover of Ill"), where lae means 'deceit, fraud; bane', and so forth.

=== Type of weapon ===
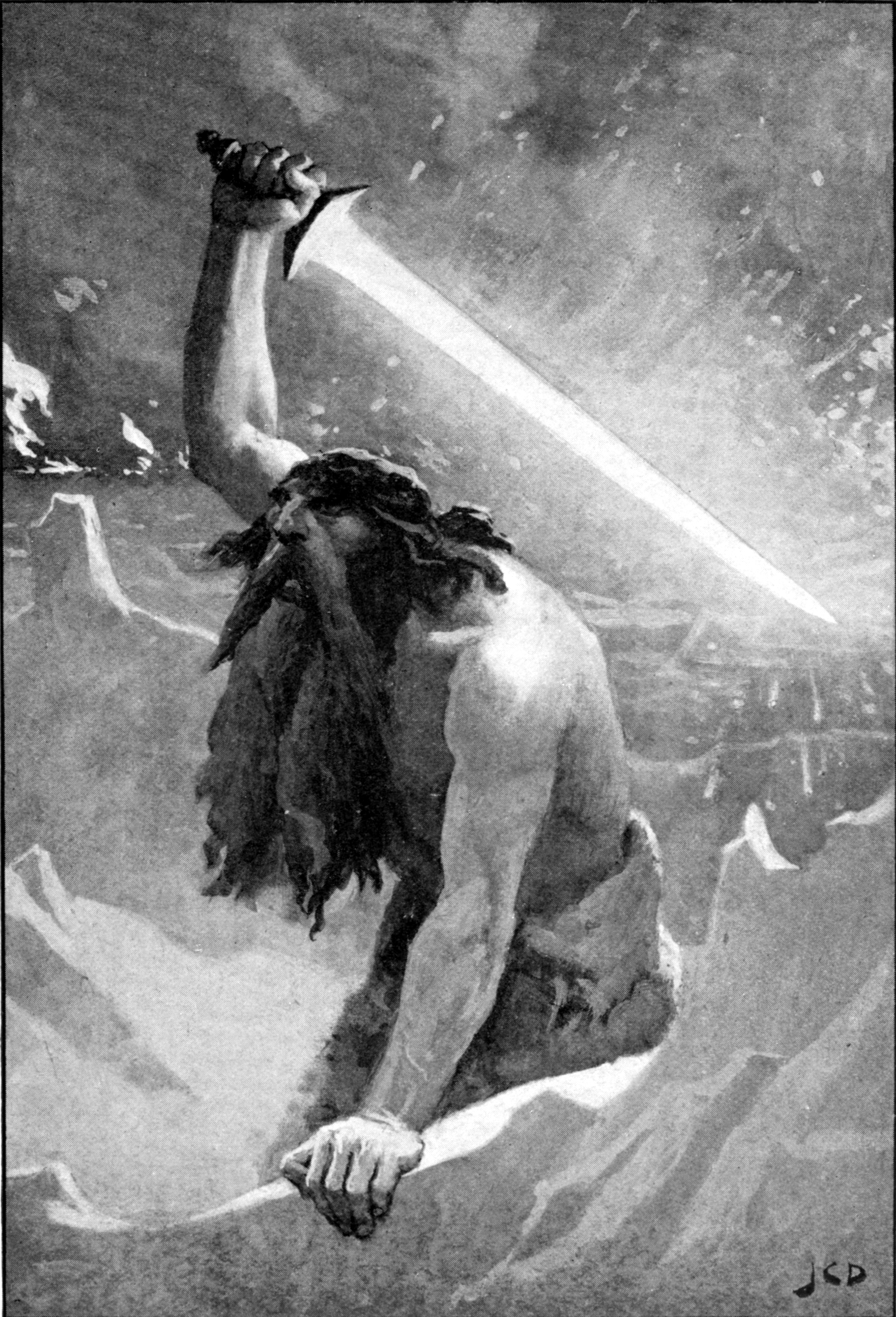
Surtr holding a shining (flaming) sword —illustr. John Charles Dollman (1909)

The identification of the type of weapon is not in agreement among commentators and translators.

The Hævateinn was interpreted to be a dart/arrow (spiculum) by Árni Magnússon and A. S. Cottle in the 18th century as already noted. Henry Adams Bellows (1923 tr.) glossed Lævateinn as meaning 'wounding wand', but rejected identification with the mistilteinn or "mistletoe with which Baldr was killed".

Finnur Jónsson in his edition glossed it as a sword, as well other editors of the Edda at the beginning of early 20th century, (Note: Sijmons, Barend; Gering, Hugo ed. (1903–31) Edda 1:207. Cited by Wanner (2009).) and it was specifically claimed to be the same as the flaming sword of the giant Surtr (cf. image right) by Henrik Schück.

Rudolf Simek (2007) considers lævateinn to be a kenning for a sword, rather than a sword name. Lee M. Hollander (2011 tr.) also noted that while Lævateinn is literally renderable as a "Wand-of-Destruction", it is etymologically considered to be a kenning for a sword.

Yet others still maintain Hævateinn or Lævateinn was probably a magic wand crafted by Loki according to other sources, e.g., Albert Morey Sturtevant, and a paper by archeologist Leszek Gardeła (2009) on seiðr magic staffs (while citing Simek's dictionary, which supports the sword-kenning interpretation). (Note: Gardeła notes that the magic staff gambanteinn also has a -teinn stem meaning 'twig'.)

In linguist Adolfo Zavaroni's conception of the poem, Lævateinn is a cudgel ("Evilcudgel"); it is Viðofnir who owns a collection of rods (divining rods) whereamong it maintains its sickle, possibly a cutting tool for shaping the rods. The interpretation hinges on taking the word völr literally in the sense of "rounded rods", although translators have figuratively interpreted the word to be the rooster's plumage. (Note: In Zavaroni's picture, Viðofnir is not a mere bird, but "one of the aspects or hypostases of the [god] Hœnir".)
