= Eir =

Norse deity

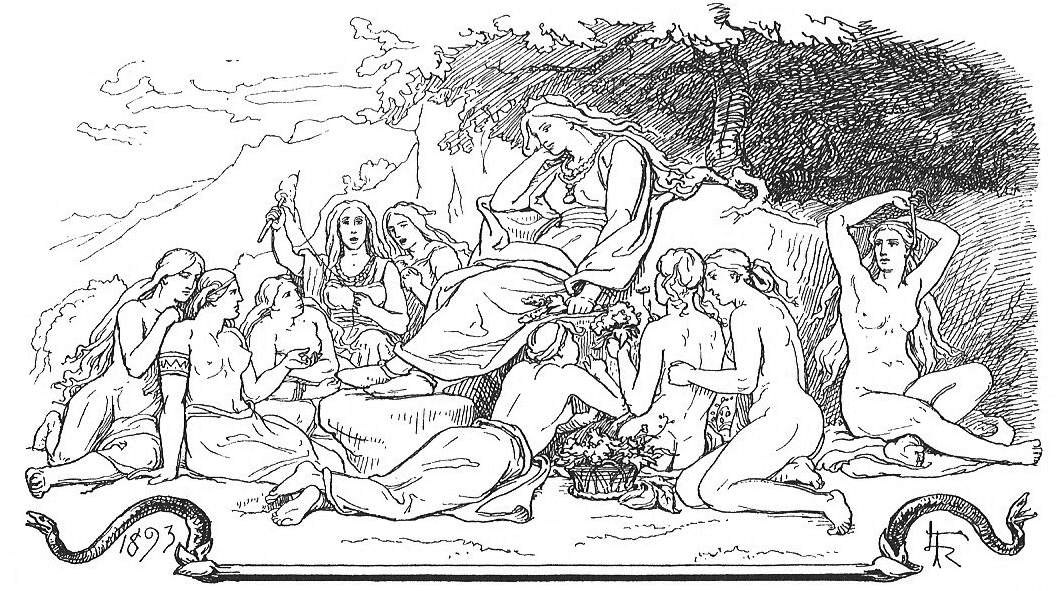
Menglöð sits with the nine maidens, including Eir, on Lyfjaberg (1893) by Lorenz Frølich.

In Norse mythology, Eir (Old Norse: [ˈɛir], "protection, help, mercy") is a goddess or valkyrie associated with medical skill. Eir is attested in the Poetic Edda, compiled in the 13th century from earlier traditional sources; the Prose Edda, written in the 13th century by Snorri Sturluson; and in skaldic poetry, including a runic inscription from Bergen, Norway from around 1300. Scholars have theorized about whether these three sources refer to the same figure, and debate whether Eir may have been originally a healing goddess or a valkyrie. In addition, Eir has been compared to the Greek goddess Hygieia.

== Attestations ==
=== Poetic Edda ===
In the Poetic Edda poem Fjölsvinnsmál, the watchman Fjölsviðr presents a list of the maidens that attend the lady of the keep—Menglöð—that includes Eir, and states that they all sit on the hill Lyfjaberg (Old Norse "hill of healing" or "healing mountain"). The exchange between the hero Svipdagr and Fjölsviðr mentioning Eir is as follows:

Henry Adams Bellows translation: Svipdag spake: "Now answer me, Fjolsvith, the question I ask, For now the truth would I know: What maidens are they that at Mengloth's knees Are sitting so gladly together?" Fjolsvith spake: "Hlif is one named, Hlifthrasa another, Thjothvara call they the third; Bjort and Bleik, Blith and Frith, Eir and Aurbotha."	Benjamin Thorpe translation: Vindkald. Tell me, Fiolsvith! etc., how these maids are called, who sit at Menglod's knees in harmony together? Fiolsvith. Hlif the first is called, the second Hlifthursa, the third Thiodvarta, Biort and Blid, Blidr, Frid, Eir, and Orboda.

After the exchange, Svipdagr asks if these figures will give aid if blót are made to them. Fjölsviðr responds that Svipdagr is correct:

Fjolsvith spake: "Soon aid they all who offers give On the holy altars high; And if danger they see for the sons of men, Then each day from ill do they guard."	Fiolsvith. Every summer in which men offer to them, at the holy place, no pestilence so great shall come to the sons of men, but they will free each from peril.

=== Prose Edda ===
In chapter 35 of the Prose Edda book Gylfaginning, the enthroned figure of High provides brief descriptions of 16 ásynjur. High lists Eir third, and says no more about her other than noting that "she is an extremely good physician." In chapter 75 of the Prose Edda book Skáldskaparmál Eir appears within a list of valkyrie names, but Eir is not included in the list of ásynjur in the same chapter.

=== Skaldic poetry and runic inscription ===
In skaldic poetry, the name Eir is frequent in kennings for women. A sample construction is Eir aura ("Eir of riches"), occurring in Gísla saga. The name is already used in this way by the 10th century poets Kormákr Ögmundarson and Hallfreðr vandræðaskáld. Similarly, the name Eir is used in a woman kenning in a runic inscription inscribed on a stick from Bergen, Norway around the year 1300. The stick records a common mercantile transaction followed by a verse from a displeased scribe (edits applied per the translator's notes):

'Wise Var of wire ["woman of filigree," meaning "wise bejeweled woman"] makes (me) sit unhappy.
Eir [woman] of mackerels' ground [likely gold] takes often and much sleep from me.'

Mindy Macleod and Bernard Mees posit that the first line of the inscription essentially means "women make me miserable" or potentially "marriage makes me miserable," whereas the second line means "women often take a lot of sleep from me."

The name remained frequently used in woman kennings in rímur poetry.

== Theories ==
Regarding the seemingly three different, seemingly conflicting, mentions of Eir, Andy Orchard says that the etymology of the name Eir may appear to fit the role of Eir as a goddess and servant of Menglöð best, but that one should consider that the valkyries also have the ability to waken the dead. John Lindow is skeptical of there having been a belief in Eir as a goddess, stating that "whether we should trust Snorri and imagine the existence of a goddess Eir is problematic". Rudolf Simek says that Eir may originally have been simply a valkyrie rather than a goddess, and lists the servant of Menglöð by the same name as a separate figure.

Hilda Ellis Davidson comments that "virtually nothing" is known about Eir outside of her association with healing, and points out that she is "singled out as one of the Norns who shape the lives of children". Davidson adds that "no satisfactory conclusions" have been drawn from her name, and considers all mentions of Eir as of the same figure. Davidson says that, in reference to Eir's appearance among Menglöð's maidens, that the names of these maidens "suggest that they are guardian spirits, and [they are] said to 'shelter and save' those who make offerings of them. They could be akin to protective spirits of the house, guarding both men and women." She additionally draws a link between these spirits and Lyfjaberg:

Lyfjaberg is where the goddess sits surrounded by her helpful spirits. Although healing by a goddess—or indeed by a god either—has left little mark on Norse myths as they have come down to us, there is no doubt that the healing power of goddesses was of enormous importance in daily life in the pre-Christian period, as was that of many women saints in Christian times. The goddess who presided over childbirth was held to possess power over life and death, and was revered as a lifegiver, both in the family home and in the courts of kings, though she might also pass sentence of death.

Henry Adams Bellows proposes a relationship between Eir and the place name Lyfjaberg, which he translates as "hill of healing". Bellows notes that manuscripts vary about the spelling of the place name, and that he, like others, has followed 19th-century scholar Sophus Bugge's choice. Bellows states that the stanza mentioning Lyfjaberg "implies that Mengloth is a goddess of healing, and hence, perhaps an hypostasis of Frigg, as already intimated by her name [...]. In stanza 54, Eir appears as one of Mengloth's handmaidens, and Eir, according to Snorri (Gylfaginning, 35) is herself the Norse Hygieia. Compare this stanza to stanza 32."
