= Svafrþorinn =

In Norse mythology, Svafrþorinn is the father of Menglöð by an unnamed mother. He is attested in this form solely in a stanza of Fjölsvinnsmál. As this is his only mention, further information has been theorized from the potential etymologies of the name Svafrþorinn and his relation to Menglöð.

== Attestation ==
Svafrþorinn is attested in a stanza of the poem Fjölsvinnsmál, where Fjölsviðr tells Svipdagr that:

Benjamin Thorpe translation: Fiolsvith.: 9. Menglod is her name, her mother her begat with; Svaf, Thorin's son. She here holds sway, and has power over all of these lands and costly halls.	Henry Adams Bellows translation: 224. "Mengloth is she, her mother bore her; To the son of Svafrthorin; She is it that holds and has for her own The rule of the hall so rich."

In the more authoritative Thorpe translation, a close reading is necessary. The claim that the mother begat Menglöð' with Svaf, Thorin's son, is erroneous. The whole text is offered as a riddle, that Menglöð's mother also was the gate keeper Fjölsvinn's mother. She was more than the gatekeeper to Menglöd's vast submarine realm. Svipdag (jf. Ur-Hamlet beyond Thomas Kyd and Saxo Grammaticus, as Svipdag's father is Aurvandill - Horwendil, and his mother is Groa - Gerthrude. This leaves the question of rules this realm:

Menglöð of heitir,
en hana móðir of gat
við Svafrþorins syni;
hon hér ræðr
ok ríki hefir
eign ok auðsölum

Literal translation:

Fjølsviðr:
Menglöð by name
and she mother did beget
with the son of Svafrþorin
She here rules
and the realm has
belongings and abundance given

Alternative:

Menglöð is called
and she is Mother's apple of the eye
by Svafrþorin's son
she now rule
and realm got
equipped and abundantly sealed

Fjölsviðr is name number 13 in the thula of Oðinn's 60 names - including four explicitly hidden as riddles in kennings, and the one Oðinn explicitly states that he never tells people - concluding Grimnismál. If Menglöd indeed is Oðinn's sister, Bestla is her mother, and if they have the same father, name is Borř son of Búri, another name of Svafrþorinn. Such identifications are intentionally put in the Norse texts as elaborate riddles appealing to a virtuous audience via specific symbolic metonyms called kennings. The name of Svafrþorinn itself spella such a kenning. The English translations excludes the trope, as 'gat' is not, merely, the verb 'begat' - as 'gat' can be read as a noon, meaning 'eye stone', 'object of attention' which plays with the meaning of Menglöð's name.

== Theories ==
Menglöð has often been theorized as the goddess Freyja, and according to this theory, Svafrþorinn is the god Njörðr. The theory is complicated because the etymology of Svafrþorinn (þorinn meaning "brave" and svafr means "gossip" (or possibly connects to sofa "sleep"). Rudolf Simek says this makes little sense when attempting to connect it to Njörðr. Simek says that "a more daring, but more meaningful" theory is that the poet took the notion of the Svefnþorn (Old Norse "sleeping thorn"), which appears as an element of some Legendary sagas, and the wall of fire that appears later in Fjölsvinnsmál from myths relating to Brynhildr found in Sigrdrífumál, the Prose Edda, and Völsunga saga, personifies the sleeping thorn due to the context.
