= Sinmara =

Giantess from Norse mythology

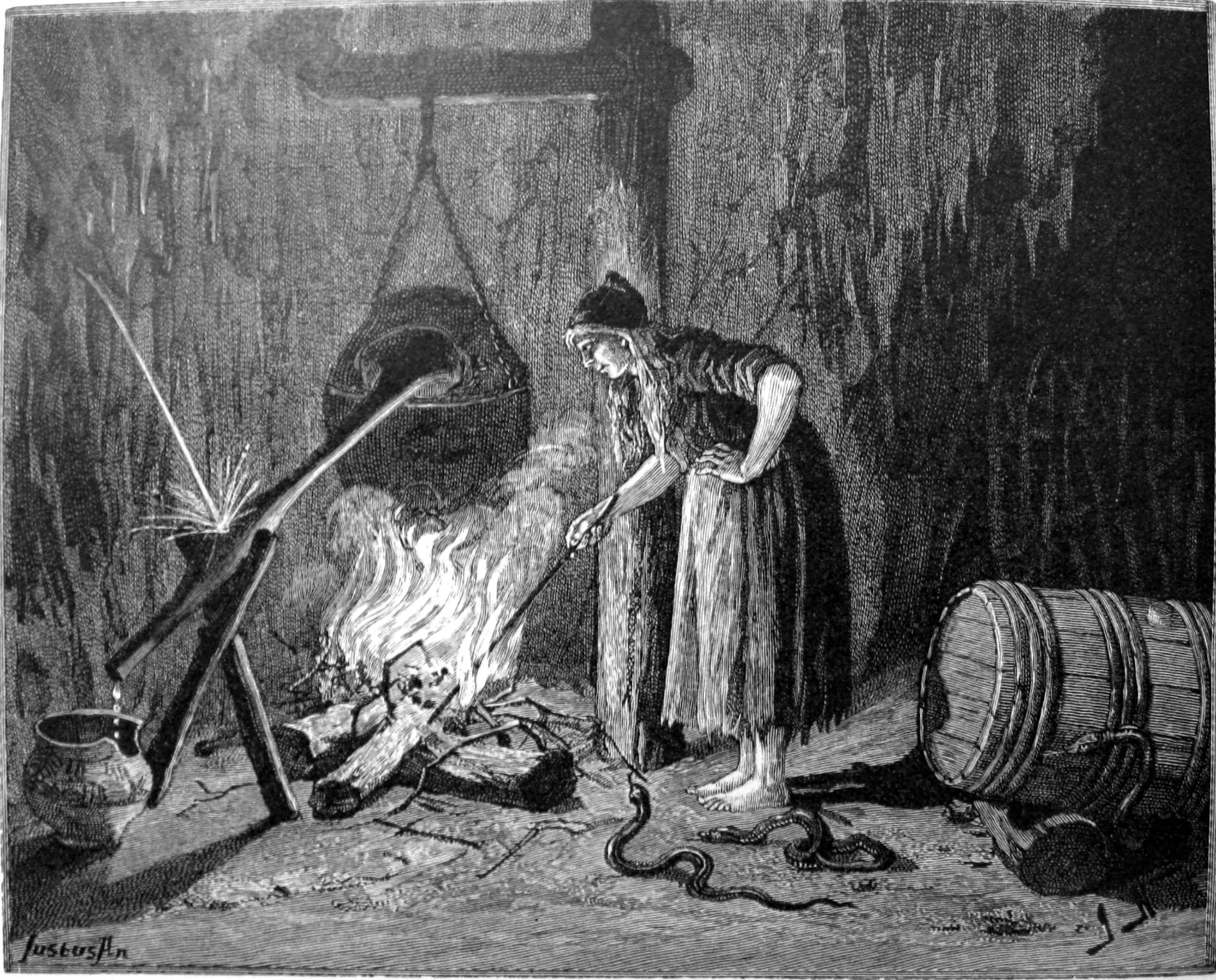
Sinmara (1893) by Jenny Nyström

In Norse mythology, Sinmara is a gýgr (giantess), usually considered a consort to the fiery jötunn Surtr, the lord of Muspelheim. Sinmara is attested solely in the poem Fjölsvinnsmál, where she is mentioned alongside Surtr in one (emended) stanza, and described as keeper of the legendary weapon Lævateinn in a later passage. Assorted theories have been proposed about the etymology of her name, and her connection with other figures in Norse mythology.

== Etymology ==
=== Nightmare ===
The etymology of the name Sinmara is obscure. However, the name has been associated with the nightmare/succubus spirit (mara) of folklore since Árni Magnússon (Magnæus)'s Poetic Edda (1787-1828). The "-mara" ending is thought cognate with mara or "night-mare". The initial sin- element is here identified as meaning "sinew" or rather "nerves", so that the total phrase comes out as "nervous (or nerve-afflicting) nightmare". Árni's edition also explained Sinmara to be a sort of "night fury" (Latin: furia nocturna).

J. Fibiger also embraced the interpretation half-way, stating the name meant "the great [night]mare", where the Sin- meaning great can be compared to Old High German sinfluth or sinvlout "great flood".

Adolfo Zavaroni and Emilia Reggio suggest the interpretation "Perpetual-incubus". (Note: The sin- element is here theorized as being the same as in the male name Sinwara, found in a runic inscription on the "Næsbjerg brooch" from Denmark, Old High German sin-vlout "great flood", Old English sin-niht(e) and Old Saxon sin-nahti "eternal night", and Gothic sin-teins "daily".)

It has also been proposed that the sin- element may refer to sindr (Old Norse "cinders"). This is consistent with the attestation in the poem Fjölsvinnsmál that she is hin fölva gýgr ("the pale giantess", or perhaps "ashes-coloured giantess"). Rudolf Simek, while assessing that sin cannot be related to the term sindr, states this would equal a "meaningful interpretation in regard to the colour"; he theorizes that a more likely interpretation is "the pale (night-)mare", noting that this would fit the wife of a fire jötunn.

=== Sinew-maimer ===
Viktor Rydberg proposed that the name Sinmara is composed of sin, meaning "sinew", and mara, meaning "the one that maims", noting that mara is related to the verb merja (citing Guðbrandur Vigfússon's dictionary (Note: While Anderson's English translation of Rydberg's Teutonic Mythology gives the word "maim" and cites Gudbrand Vigfusson's Icelandic-English Dictionary (1874), the dictionary has "to bruise, crush" in its entry for Merja on page 424.)), Rydberg concludes that the name Sinmara thus means "the one who maims by doing violence to the sinews," thus identifying her as Nidhad's wife, who orders Völund's sinews cut to prevent his escape, in the eddic poem Völundarkviða.

== Fjölsvinnsmál ==
Sinmara is solely attested in the Eddaic poem Fjölsvinnsmál. The poem refers to her as a pale giantess (gýgr), so she is "probably a giantess". (Note: "Sinmara.. furia gigantea allegoricae")

The poem Fjölsvinnsmál is a bridal quest, in which Svipdagr eventually gains entry to the mansion that houses his would-be bride Menglöð. Svipdagr (under the pseudonym Vindkaldr) poses questions to the watchman Fjölsviðr ("Much Wise") and gathers intelligence about the mansion. He gleans the fact that the guard-hounds of the mansion can only be distracted by the meat of the rooster Víðófnir. This is where Sinmara figures, as the keeper of Lævateinn, the only weapon capable of slaying the rooster:

Fjǫsviþr kvaþ:
'Lǽvateinn heitir, es gørþi Loptr rúnum
fyr nágrindr neþan;
Í Lǽgjarns keri liggr hjá Sinmǫru,
ok halda njarþlásar niu.'

— Hildebrand et al. edition
Translation:

Fjolsvith spake:
"Lævatein (Note: "Hævatein[n]" in original mss. reading; cf. Magnæus (1787), p. 295 and Thorpe (1907) str. 26–27, pp. 98–99.) is there, that Lopt with runes
Once made by the doors of death;
In Lægjarn's chest (Note: Printed as saeg iárnkeri in Magnæus (1787), p. 295 and rendered as "an iron chest" in Thorpe (1907), pp. 96–97. However, Bellows (1923:246-7) explained as sæ-gjarn "Sea-lover" emended by Falk to Lægjarn "Lover of Ill," an epithet of Loki.)
by Sinmora lies it,
And nine locks fasten it firm."

— Henry Adams Bellows translation

That Sinmara will only award the weapon to one who brings her the tail feather of the rooster creates an insurmountable paradox to obtaining it. Fjölsviðr insinuates that a man may succeed in obtaining the weapon Lævateinn if a man carries a certain hard-to-obtain item to Sinmora (here she is referred to as eir aurglasis or "the goddess of gold"). (Note: Rydberg (1889), p. 519 gives "the dis of the shining arm-ring".) Svipdag in turn inquires what treasure it is that would so delight Sinmara (fǫlva gýgr or "the giantess pale"). (Note: Or "the ashes-coloured giantess".Rydberg (1889), p. 519) Fjölsviðr then replies Svipdagr must bring the "bright sickle" to Sinmara, and then she will give Lævateinn to Svipdagr:

Fjǫsviþr kvaþ:
'Ljósan lea skaltu í lúþr bera
þanns liggr í Viþofnis vǫlum,
Sinmǫru at selja, áþr hón sǫm telisk
vápn til vígs at lea.'

— Hildebrand et al. edition
Translation:

Fjolsvith spake:
"The sickle bright in thy wallet bear,
Mid Vithofnir's feathers found;
To Sinmora give it, and then shall she grant
That the weapon by thee be won."

— Henry Adams Bellows translation

Sinmara has so far been mentioned twice explicitly, and twice by periphrases. In certain editions and translations, she is mentioned explicitly a third time as a product of emendation (in an earlier strophe than quoted above). Thus in the modified readings of certain editions and in Bellows' translation, Fjölsviðr names Sinmara and Surtr together, and says that the two are endangered by the rooster Víðópnir that sits atop the tree Mímameiðr:

Fjǫsviþr kvaþ:
'Viþofnir heitir, en hann stendr veþrglasi
á meiþs kvistum Mima:
einum ekka þryngr hann ørófsaman
Surt ok Sinmǫru.'

— Hildebrand et al. edition
Translation:

Fjolsvith spake:
"Vithofnir his name, and now he shines
Like lightning on Mimameith's limbs;
And great is the trouble with which he grieves
Both Surt and Sinmora."

— Henry Adams Bellows translation

However the original reading of this same strophe does not give mention of Sinmara:

Fjösviþr qvaþ:
'Viþofnir han heitir; En hann stendr veþr-glasi
á Meiþs kvistvm Míma:
einum ecka þrúngr han ó-rof saman
Svrtr sinn mavtv.'

— Árni Magnússon edition, 1787
Translation:

Fiolsvith.
Vidofnir he is called; in the clear air he stands,
in the boughs of Mima's tree:
afflictions only bring together indissoluble,
the swart bird at his lonely meal.

— Benjamin Thorpe translation

== Theories ==
Henry Adams Bellows comments that Sinmara is "presumably Surt's wife". In the theories of Viktor Rydberg, Sinmara is the wife of Mímir, the mother of Nótt, Böðvildr, "and other night dísir". According to Rydberg, the byname Sinmara refers to "Mímir-Niðhad"'s "queen ordering Völund's hamstrings to be cut".

Hjalmar Falk states that "Sinmara [...] is probably no other than Hel, Loki's daughter." He says that Sinmara is specifically called hin fölva gýgr "the pale giantess" in Fjölsvinnsmál, just as the classical Roman poet Virgil speaks of the pale Orcus, a god of the underworld in Roman mythology, and that Hel is blue or half blue and half light, like the Roman goddess Proserpina, whom Saxo equates to Hel in his Gesta Danorum. Falk further notes that Sinmara is referred to as aurglasis Eirr, which he translates as "the goddess of the gold ring", and compares Hel's being called Gjallar sunnu gátt "wearer of the necklace" in stanza 9 of the poem Forspjallsljóð. Björn Olsen associates the kenning with veðurglasir, a name of Yggdrasill in stanza 24 of the same poem, and translates aurglasir as a name for the root system of the world-tree.
