= Njörðr =

God among the Vanir in Norse mythology

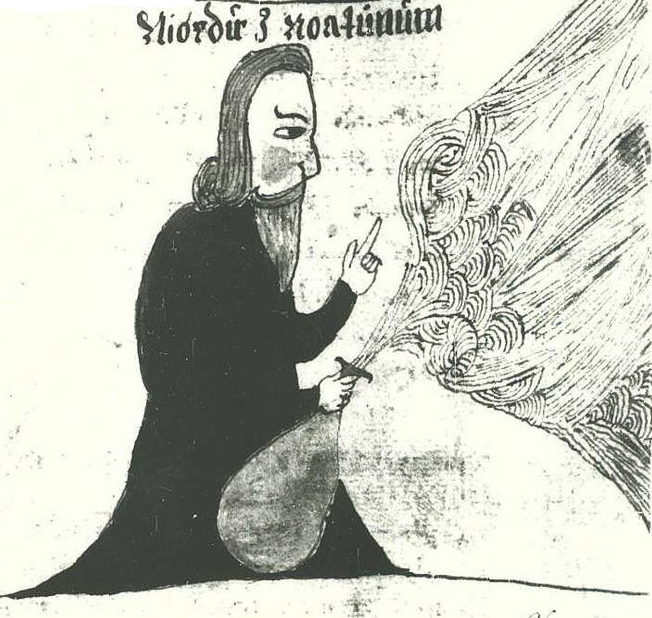
17th-century Icelandic illustration of Njörðr

In Norse mythology, Njörðr (Old Norse: Njǫrðr) is a god associated with the sea, navigation, fishing, wind, wealth, and crop fertility. He is the father of the deities Freyr and Freyja by his unnamed twin sister, and had an unhappy marriage with the goddess Skaði. He lives in Nóatún and is a member of the Vanir.

Njörðr is attested in the Poetic Edda, compiled in the 13th century from earlier traditional sources, the Prose Edda, written in the 13th century by Snorri Sturluson, in euhemerized form as a beloved mythological early king of Sweden in Heimskringla, also written by Snorri Sturluson in the 13th century, as one of three gods invoked in the 14th century Hauksbók ring oath, and in numerous Scandinavian place names. Veneration of Njörðr survived into the 18th or 19th century Norwegian folk practice, where the god is recorded as Njor and thanked for a bountiful catch of fish.

Njörðr has been the subject of an amount of scholarly discourse and theory, often connecting him with the figure of the much earlier attested Germanic goddess Nerthus, the hero Hadingus, and theorizing on his formerly more prominent place in Norse paganism due to the appearance of his name in numerous place names. Njörðr is sometimes modernly anglicized as Njord, Njoerd, or Njorth.

== Name and eponyms ==
The name Njörðr corresponds to that of the older Germanic fertility goddess Nerthus (early 1st c. CE). Both derive from the Proto-Germanic theonym *Nerþuz.

The original meaning of the name is contested, but it may be related to the Irish word nert which means "force" and "power". It has been suggested that the change of sex from the female Nerthus to the male Njörðr is due to the fact that feminine nouns with u-stems disappeared early in Germanic language while the masculine nouns with u-stems prevailed. However, other scholars hold the change to be based not on grammatical gender but on the evolution of religious beliefs; that *Nerþuz and Njörðr appear as different genders because they are to be considered separate beings. The name Njörðr may be related to the name of the Norse goddess Njörun.

Njörðr's name appears in various place names in Scandinavia, such as Nærdhæwi (now Nalavi, Närke), Njærdhavi (now Mjärdevi, Linköping; both using the religious term vé), Nærdhælunda (now Närlunda, Helsingborg), Nierdhatunum (now Närtuna, Uppland) in Sweden, Njarðvík in southwest Iceland, Njarðarlög and Njarðey (now Nærøya) in Norway. Njörðr's name appears in a word for sponge; Njarðarvöttr (Old Norse: Njarðarvǫttr, "Njörðr's glove"). Additionally, in Old Icelandic translations of Classical mythology the Roman god Saturn's name is glossed as "Njörðr".

== Attestations ==
=== Poetic Edda ===
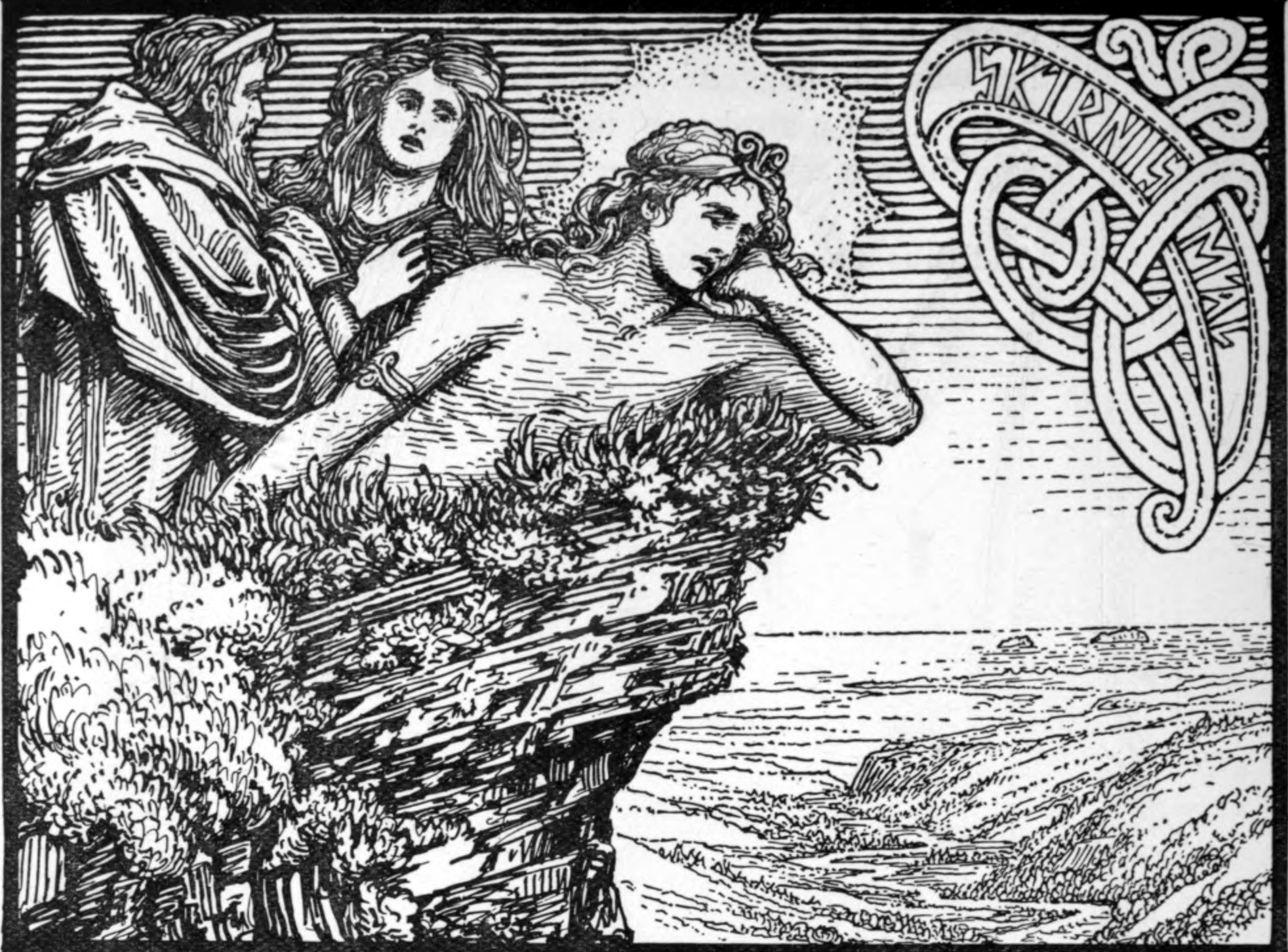
Njörðr, Skaði, and Freyr as depicted in The Lovesickness of Freyr by W. G. Collingwood (1908)

Njörðr is described as a future survivor of Ragnarök in stanza 39 of the poem Vafþrúðnismál. In the poem, the god Odin, disguised as "Gagnráðr" faces off with the wise jötunn Vafþrúðnir in a battle of wits. While Odin states that Vafþrúðnir knows all the fates of the gods, Odin asks Vafþrúðnir "from where Njörðr came to the sons of the Æsir", that Njörðr rules over quite a lot of temples and hörgrs (a type of Germanic altar), and further adds that Njörðr was not raised among the Æsir. In response, Vafþrúðnir says:

In Vanaheim the wise Powers made him
and gave him as hostage to the gods;
at the doom of men he will come back
home among the wise Vanir.

In stanza 16 of the poem Grímnismál, Njörðr is described as having a hall in Nóatún made for himself. The stanza describes Njörðr as a "prince of men", that he is "lacking in malice", and that he "rules over the "high-timbered temple." In stanza 43, the creation of the god Freyr's ship Skíðblaðnir is recounted, and Freyr is cited as the son of Njörðr. In the prose introduction to the poem Skírnismál, Freyr is mentioned as the son of Njörðr, and stanza 2 cites the goddess Skaði as the mother of Freyr. Further in the poem, Njörðr is again mentioned as the father of Freyr in stanzas 38, 39, and 41.

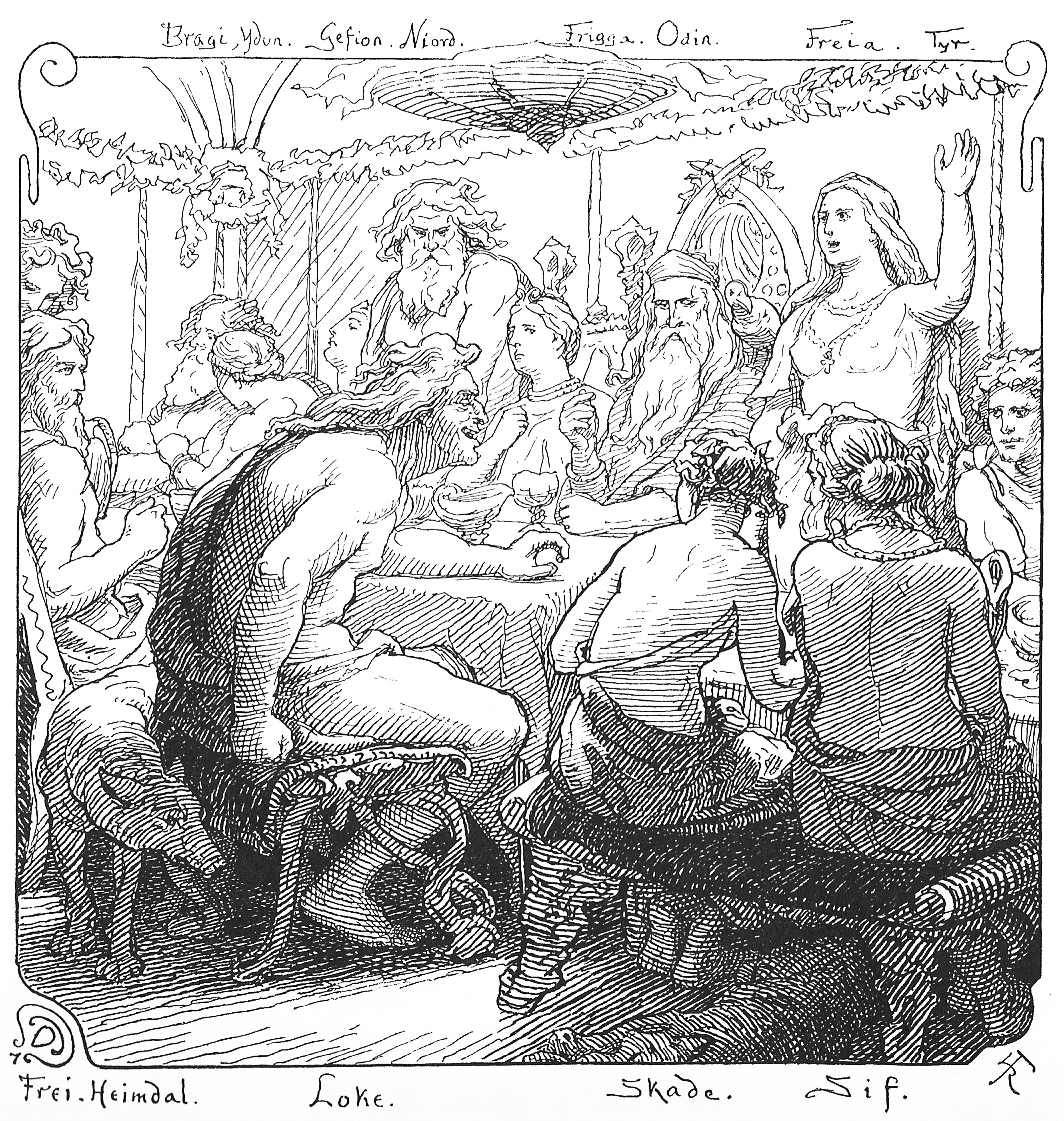
Lokasenna by Lorenz Frølich (1895)

In the late flyting poem Lokasenna, an exchange between Njörðr and Loki occurs in stanzas 33, 34, 35, and 36. After Loki has an exchange with the goddess Freyja, in stanza 33 Njörðr states:

That's harmless, if, besides a husband, a woman has
a lover or someone else;
what is surprising is a pervert god coming in here,
who has borne children.

Loki responds in the stanza 34, stating that "from here you were sent east as hostage to the gods" (a reference to the Æsir-Vanir War) and that "the daughters of Hymir used you as a pisspot, and pissed in your mouth." In stanza 35, Njörðr responds that:

That was my reward, when I, from far away,
was sent as a hostage to the gods,
that I fathered that son, whom no one hates
and is thought the prince of the Æsir.

Loki tells Njörðr to "stop" and "keep some moderation", and that he "won't keep it a secret any longer" that Njörðr's son Freyr was produced with his unnamed sister, "though you'd expect him to be worse than he is." The god Tyr then interjects and the flyting continues in turn.

In stanza 22 of the poem Þrymskviða, Njörðr is referenced where he is referred to as the father of the goddess Freyja. In the poem, the jötunn Þrymr mistakenly thinks that he will be receiving the goddess Freyja as his bride, and while telling his fellow jötunn to spread straw on the benches in preparation for the arrival of Freyja, he refers to her as the daughter of Njörðr of Nóatún. In stanza 79 of the poem Sólarljóð, Njörðr is referenced as the father of nine daughters by unknown mother. The names of two daughters are mentioned: the eldest, Ráðveig (also named Böðveig), and the youngest, Kreppvör. But the names of other seven daughters are unknown

=== Prose Edda ===
Njörðr is also mentioned in the Prose Edda books Gylfaginning and Skáldskaparmál.

==== Gylfaginning ====
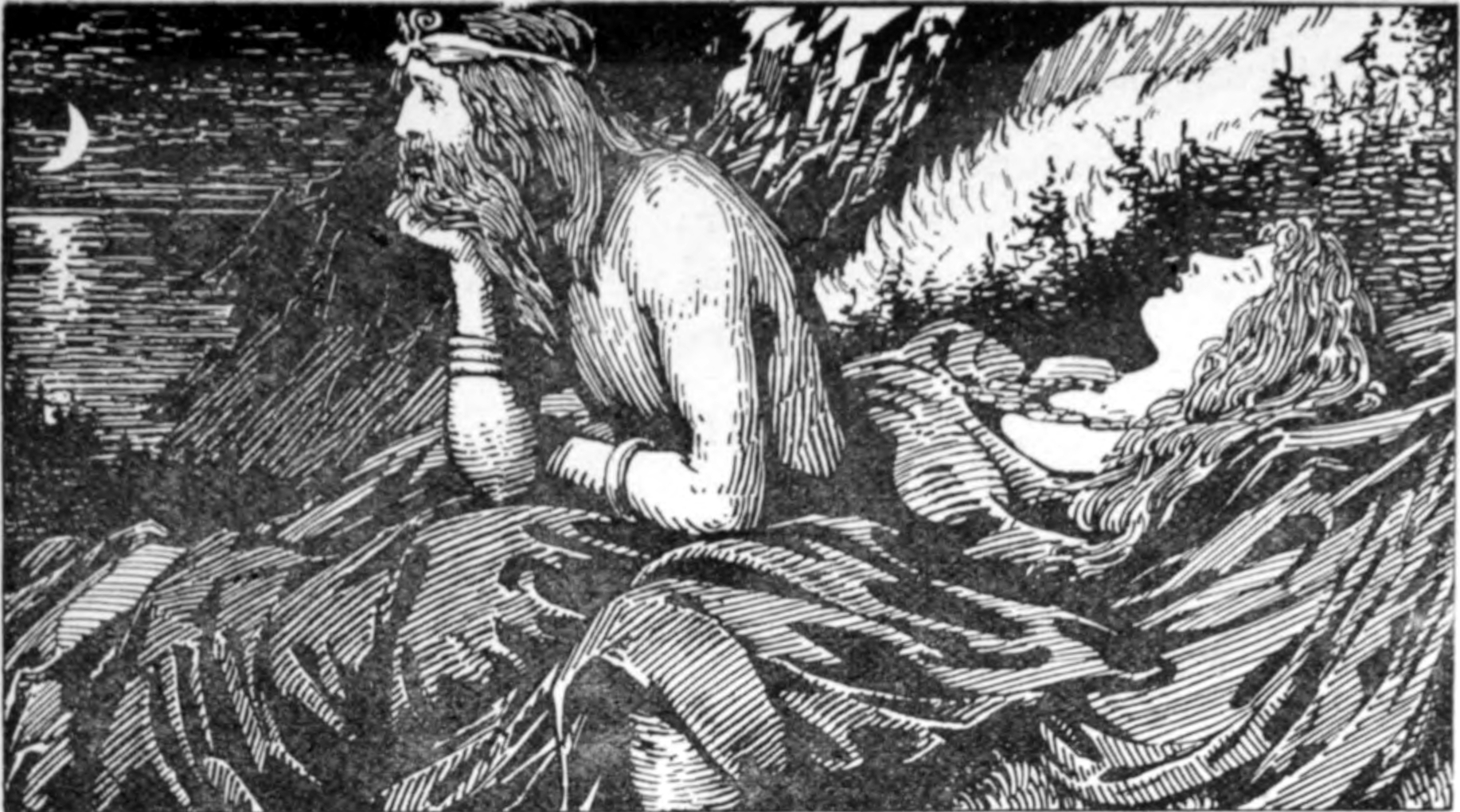
Njörd's desire for the Sea by W. G. Collingwood (1908)

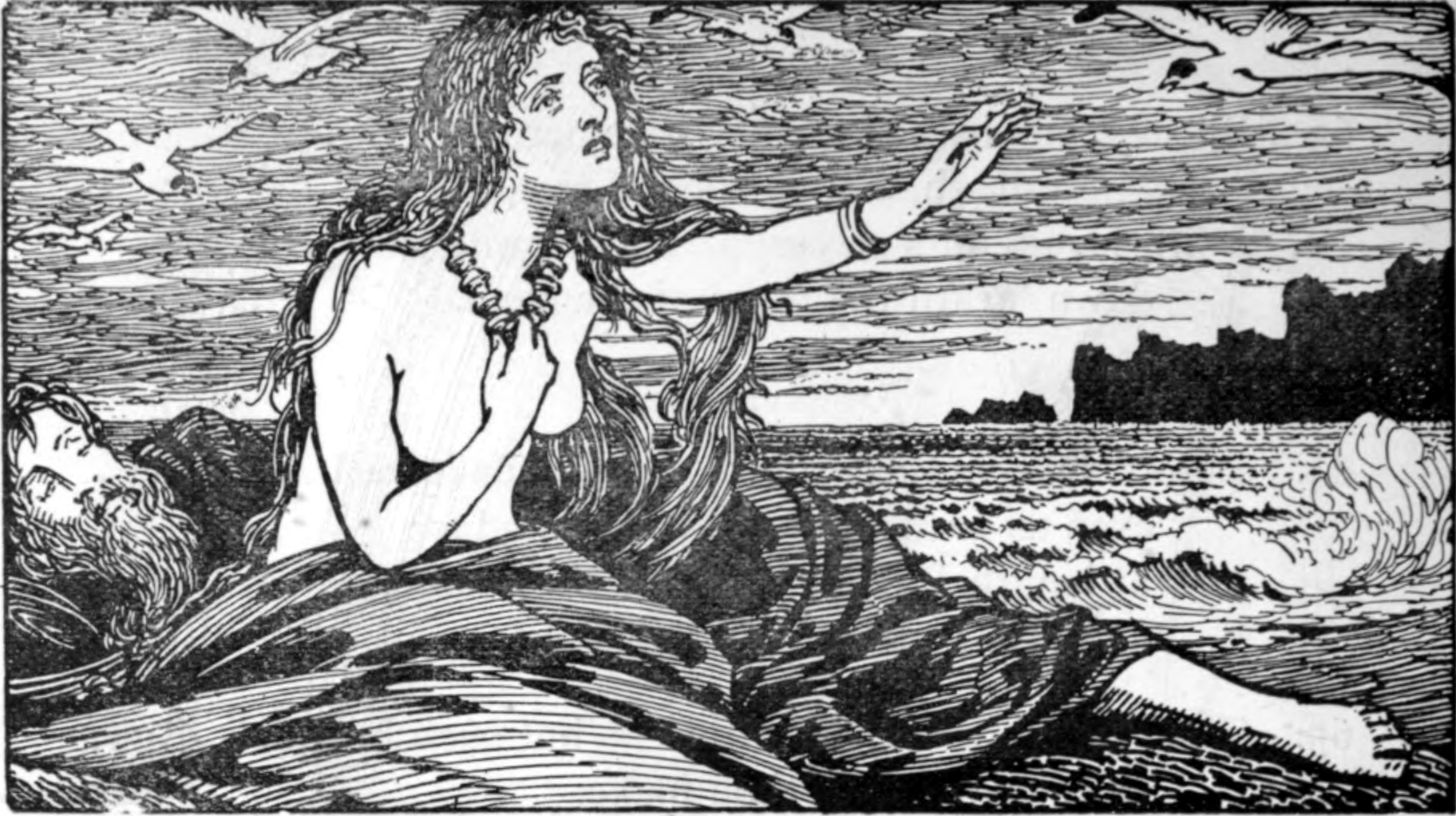
Skadi's desire for the Mountains by W. G. Collingwood (1908)

In the Prose Edda, Njörðr is introduced in chapter 23 of the book Gylfaginning. In this chapter, Njörðr is described by the enthroned figure of High as living in the heavens at Nóatún, but also as ruling over the movement of the winds, having the ability to calm both sea and fire, and that he is to be invoked in seafaring and fishing. High continues that Njörðr is very wealthy and prosperous, and that he can also grant wealth in land and valuables to those who request his aid. Njörðr originates from Vanaheimr and is devoid of Æsir stock, and he is described as having been traded with Hœnir in hostage exchange with between the Æsir and Vanir.

High further states that Njörðr's wife is Skaði, that she is the daughter of the jötunn Þjazi, and recounts a tale involving the two. High recalls that Skaði wanted to live in the home once owned by her father called Þrymheimr ("Thunder Home"). However, Njörðr wanted to live nearer to the sea. Subsequently, the two made an agreement that they would spend nine nights in Þrymheimr and then next three nights in Nóatún (or nine winters in Þrymheimr and another nine in Nóatún according to the Codex Regius manuscript). However, when Njörðr returned from the mountains to Nóatún, he said:

Hateful for me are the mountains,
I was not long there,
only nine nights.
The howling of the wolves
sounded ugly to me
after the song of the swans.

Skaði then responds:

Sleep I could not
on the sea beds
for the screeching of the bird.
That gull wakes me
when from the wide sea
he comes each morning.

High states that afterward Skaði went back up to the mountains to Þrymheimr and recites a stanza in which Skaði skis around, hunts animals with a bow, and lives in her father's former residence. Chapter 24 begins, which describes Njörðr as the father of two beautiful and powerful children: Freyr and Freyja. In chapter 37, after Freyr has spotted the beautiful jötunn Gerðr, he becomes overcome with sorrow, and refuses to sleep, drink, or talk. Njörðr then sends for Skírnir to find out who he seems to be so angry at, and, not looking forward to being treated roughly, Skírnir reluctantly goes to Freyr.

==== Skáldskaparmál ====
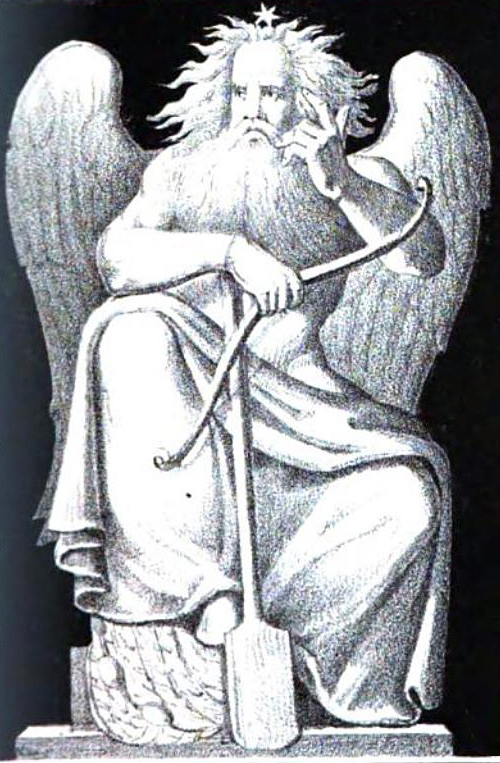
Njörðr in Die Helden und Götter des Nordens, oder Das Buch der Sagen (1832)

Njörðr is introduced in Skáldskaparmál within a list of 12 Æsir attending a banquet held for Ægir. Further in Skáldskaparmál, the skaldic god Bragi recounts the death of Skaði's father Þjazi by the Æsir. As one of the three acts of reparation performed by the Æsir for Þjazi's death, Skaði was allowed by the Æsir to choose a husband from amongst them, but given the stipulation that she may not see any part of them but their feet when making the selection. Expecting to choose the god Baldr by the beauty of the feet she selects, Skaði instead finds that she has picked Njörðr.

In chapter 6, a list of kennings is provided for Njörðr: "God of chariots", "Descendant of Vanir", "a Van", father of Freyr and Freyja, and "the giving God". This is followed by an excerpt from a composition by the 11th century skald Þórðr Sjáreksson, explained as containing a reference to Skaði leaving Njörðr:

Gundrun became her son's slayer; the wise god-bride [Skadi] could not love the Van; Kialar [Odin] trained horses pretty well; Hamdir is said not to have held back sword-play.

Chapter 7 follows and provides various kennings for Freyr, including referring to him as the son of Njörðr. This is followed by an excerpt from a work by the 10th-century skald Egill Skallagrímsson that references Njörðr (here anglicized as "Niord"):

For Freyr and Niord have endowed Griotbiorn with a power of wealth.

In chapter 20, "daughter of Njörðr" is given as a kenning for Freyja. In chapter 33, Njörðr is cited among the gods attending a banquet held by Ægir. In chapter 37, Freyja is again referred to as Njörðr's daughter in a verse by the 12th century skald Einarr Skúlason. In chapter 75, Njörðr is included in a list of the Æsir. Additionally, Njörðr is used in kennings for "warrior" or "warriors" various times in Skáldskaparmál.

=== Heimskringla ===
Njörðr appears in or is mentioned in three Kings' sagas collected in Heimskringla; Ynglinga saga, the Saga of Hákon the Good and the Saga of Harald Graycloak. In chapter 4 of Ynglinga saga, Njörðr is introduced in connection with the Æsir-Vanir War. When the two sides became tired of war, they came to a peace agreement and exchanged hostages. For their part, the Vanir send to the Æsir their most "outstanding men"; Njörðr, described as wealthy, and Freyr, described as his son, in exchange for the Æsir's Hœnir. Additionally, the Æsir send Mímir in exchange for the wise Kvasir.

Further into chapter 4, Odin appoints Njörðr and Freyr as priests of sacrificial offerings, and they became gods among the Æsir. Freyja is introduced as a daughter of Njörðr, and as the priestess at the sacrifices. In the saga, Njörðr is described as having once wed his unnamed sister while he was still among the Vanir, and the couple produced their children Freyr and Freyja from this union, though this custom was forbidden among the Æsir.

Chapter 5 relates that Odin gave all of his temple priests dwelling places and good estates, in Njörðr's case being Nóatún. Chapter 8 states that Njörðr married a woman named Skaði, though she would not have intercourse with him. Skaði then marries Odin, and the two had numerous sons.

In chapter 9, Odin dies and Njörðr takes over as ruler of the Swedes, and he continues the sacrifices. The Swedes recognize him as their king, and pay him tribute. Njörðr's rule is marked with peace and many great crops, so much so that the Swedes believed that Njörðr held power over the crops and over the prosperity of mankind. During his rule, most of the Æsir die, their bodies are burned, and sacrifices are made by men to them. Njörðr has himself "marked for" Odin and he dies in his bed. Njörðr's body is burnt by the Swedes, and they weep heavily at his tomb. After Njörðr's reign, his son Freyr replaces him, and he is greatly loved and "blessed by good seasons like his father."

In chapter 14 of Saga of Hákon the Good a description of the pagan Germanic custom of Yule is given. Part of the description includes a series of toasts. The toasts begin with Odin's toasts, described as for victory and power for the king, followed by Njörðr and Freyr's toast, intended for good harvests and peace (Old Norse: til árs ok friðar). Following this, a beaker is drunk for the king, and then a toast is given for departed kin. Chapter 28 quotes verse where the kenning "Njörðr-of-roller-horses" is used for "sailor". In the Saga of Harald Graycloak, a stanza is given of a poem entitled Vellekla ("Lack of Gold") by the 10th century Icelandic skald Einarr skálaglamm that mentions Njörðr in a kenning for "warrior".

=== Egils saga ===
In chapter 80 of the 13th century Icelandic saga Egils saga, Egill Skallagrímsson composes a poem in praise of Arinbjörn (Arinbjarnarkviða). In stanza 17, Egill writes that all others watch in marvel how Arinbjörn gives out wealth, as he has been so endowed by the gods Freyr and Njörðr.

== Modern era folk practice ==
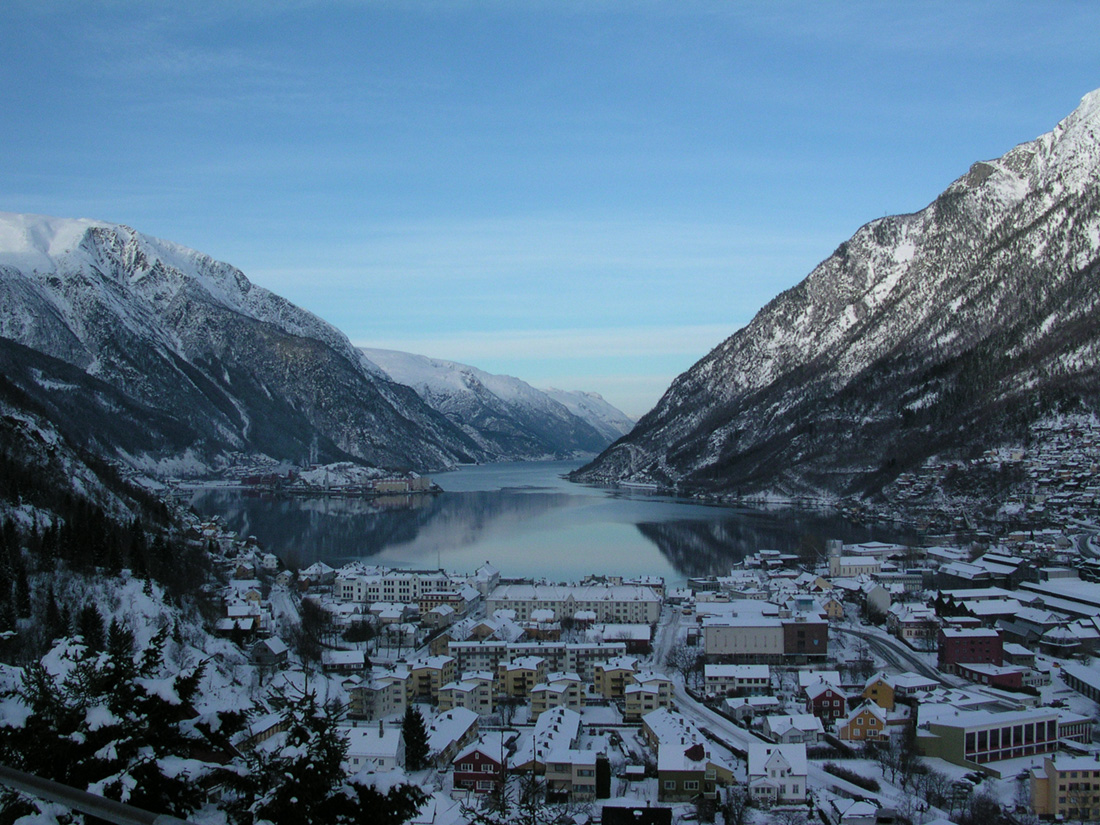
Odda, Norway, in the winter of 2004

Veneration of Njörðr survived into 18th or 19th century Norwegian folk practice, as recorded in a tale collected by Halldar O. Opedal from an informant in Odda Municipality, Hordaland, Norway. The informant comments on a family tradition in which the god is thanked for a bountiful catch of fish:

The old folk [folk in the olden days?] were always rather lucky when they went fishing. One night old Gunnhild Reinsnos (born in 1746) and Johannes Reinsnos were fishing in the Sjosavatn. They had taken a torch and were fishing with live bait. The fish bit well, and it wasn't long before Gunnhild had a week's supply of fish for her pot. So she wound her line around her rod with the words: "Thanks be to him, to Njor, for this time."

Scholar Georges Dumézil further cites various tales of "sea people" (Norwegian: havmennesker) who govern over sea weather, wealth, or, in some incidents, give magic boats, and proposes that they are historically connected to Njörðr.

== Scholastic reception ==
=== Nerthus ===
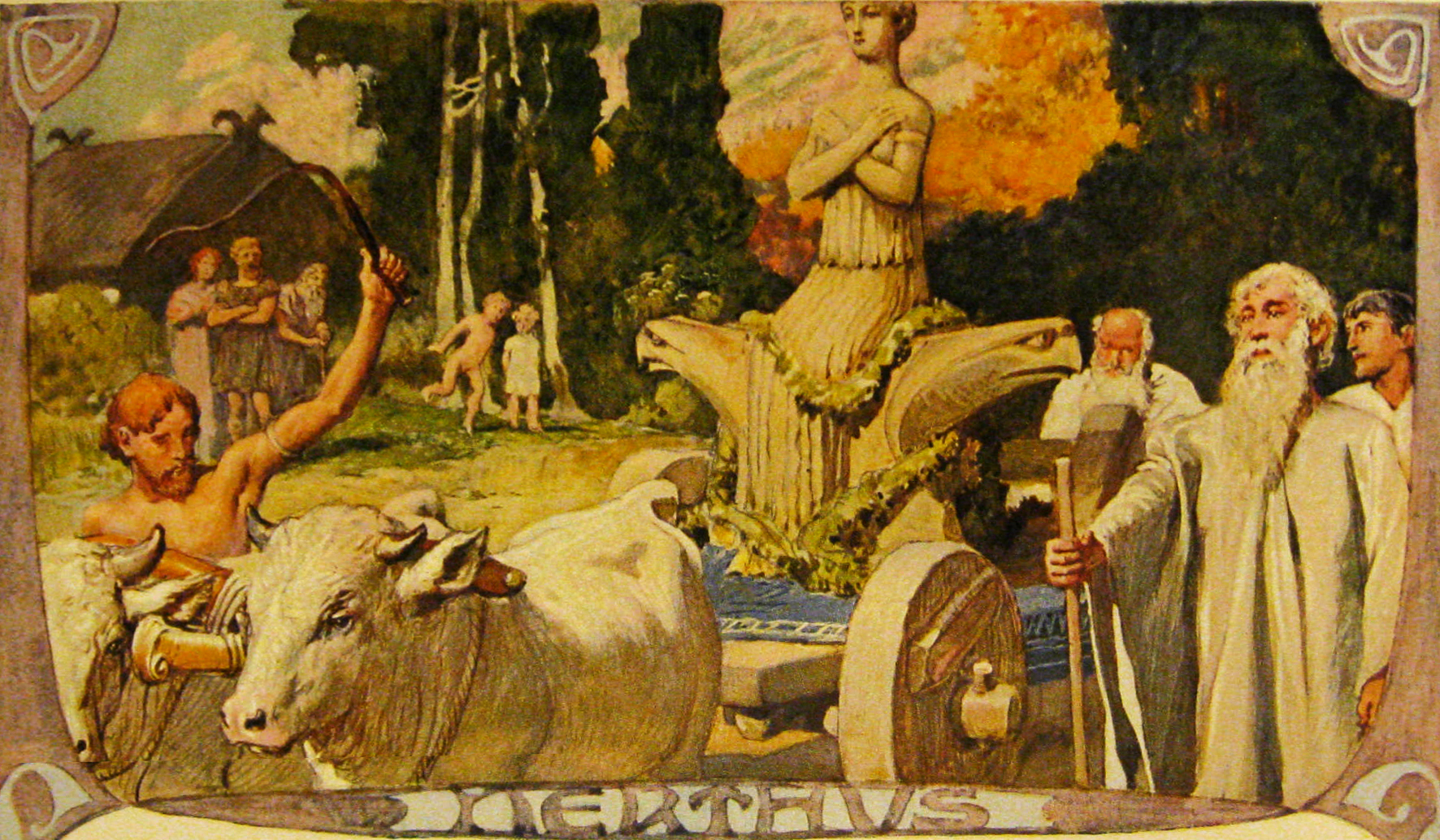
Nerthus by Emil Doepler (1905)

Njörðr is often identified with the goddess Nerthus, whose reverence by various Germanic tribes is described by Roman historian Tacitus in his 1st CE century work Germania. The connection between the two is due to the linguistic relationship between Njörðr and the reconstructed *Nerþuz, "Nerthus" being the feminine, Latinized form of what Njörðr would have looked like around 1 CE. This has led to theories about the relation of the two, including that Njörðr may have once been a hermaphroditic god or, generally considered more likely, that the name may indicate an otherwise unattested divine brother and sister pair such as Freyr and Freyja. Consequently, Nerthus has been identified with Njörðr's unnamed sister with whom he had Freyja and Freyr, which is mentioned in Lokasenna.

=== Bieka-Galles ===
In Saami mythology, Bieka-Galles (or Biega-, Biegga-Galles, depending on dialect; "The Old Man of the Winds") is a deity who rules over rain and wind, and is the subject of boat and wooden shovel (or, rather, oar) offerings. Due to similarities in between descriptions of Njörðr in Gylfaginning and descriptions of Bieka-Galles in 18th century missionary reports, Axel Olrik identified this deity as the result of influence from the seafaring North Germanic peoples on the landbound Saami.

=== Hadingus ===
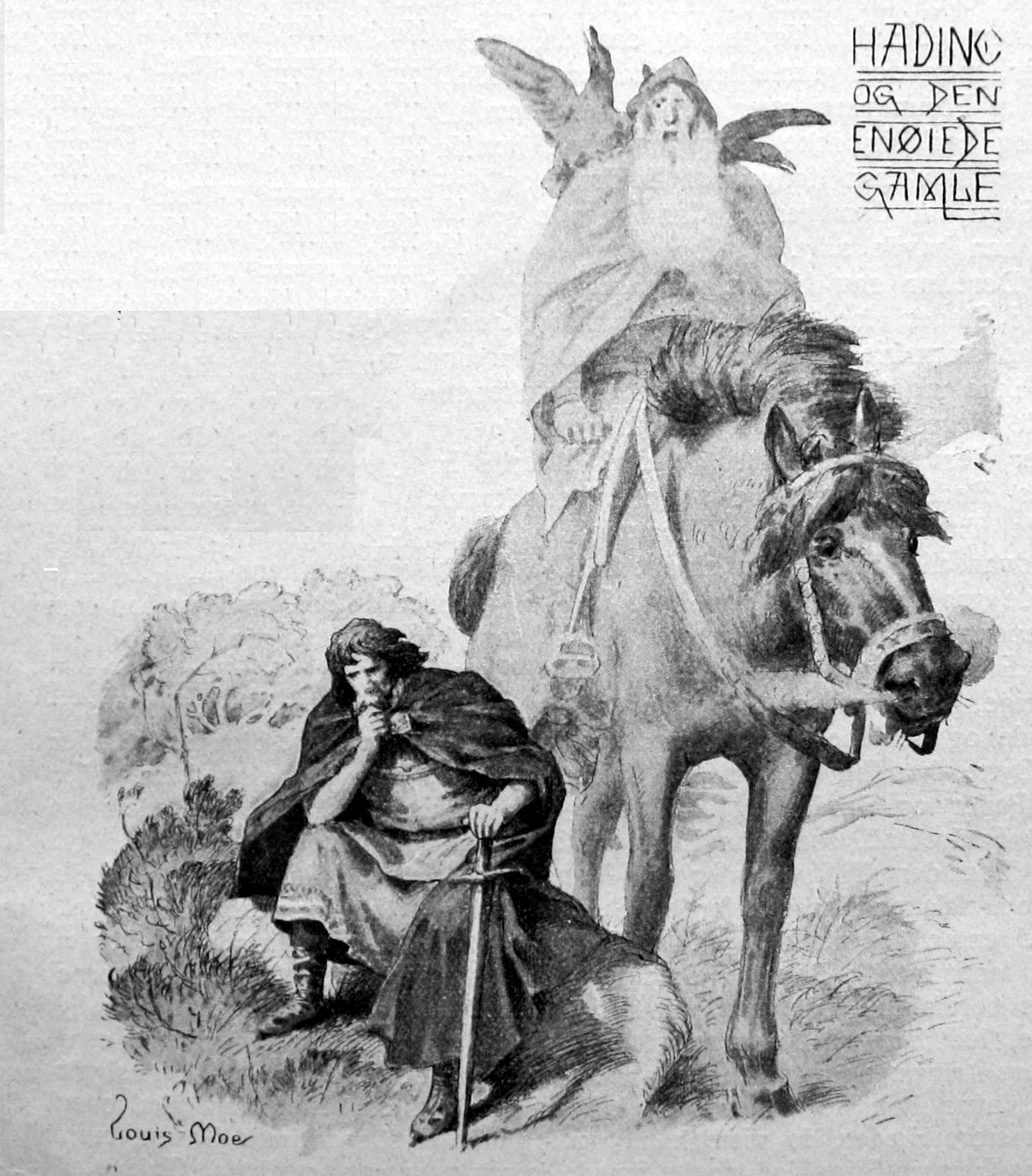
Hadingus meets the one-eyed old man, by Louis Moe

Parallels have been pointed out between Njörðr and the figure of Hadingus, attested in book I of Saxo Grammaticus' 13th century work Gesta Danorum. Some of these similarities include that, in parallel to Skaði and Njörðr in Skáldskaparmál, Hadingus is chosen by his wife Ragnhild after selecting him from other men at a banquet by his lower legs, and, in parallel to Skaði and Njörðr in Gylfaginning, Hadingus complains in verse of his displeasure at his life away from the sea and how he is disturbed by the howls of wolves, while his wife Regnhild complains of life at the shore and states her annoyance at the screeching sea birds. Georges Dumézil theorized that in the tale Hadingus passes through all three functions of his trifunctional hypothesis, before ending as an Odinic hero, paralleling Njörðr's passing from the Vanir to the Æsir in the Æsir-Vanir War.

=== Svafrþorinn ===
In stanza 8 of the poem "Fjölsvinnsmál", Svafrþorinn is stated as the father of Menglöð by an unnamed mother, who the hero Svipdagr seeks. Menglöð has often been theorized as the goddess Freyja, and according to this theory, Svafrþorinn would therefore be Njörðr. The theory is complicated by the etymology of the name Svafrþorinn (þorinn meaning 'brave' and svafr meaning 'gossip' or possibly being connected to sofa 'sleep'), which Rudolf Simek says makes little sense when attempting to connect it to Njörðr.

== Modern influence ==
Njörðr has been the subject of artistic depictions including Skade und Niurd by K. Ehrenberg (1883), Njörðr by Carl Frederick von Saltza (1893), Skadi by E. Doepler (1901), and Njörd's desire of the Sea by W. G. Collingwood (1908).

Njörðr is one of the incarnated gods in the New Zealand comedy/drama "The Almighty Johnsons". The part of "Johan Johnson/Njörðr" is played by Stuart Devenie.

== General and cited references ==
- Byock, Jesse (Trans.) (2006). The Prose Edda. Penguin Classics. ISBN 0-14-044755-5.
- de Vries, Jan (1977) [1962]. Altnordisches etymologisches Wörterbuch. Brill. ISBN 978-90-04-05436-3.
- Dumézil, Georges (1973). From Myth to Fiction: The Saga of Hadingus. University of Chicago Press. ISBN 978-0-226-16972-9.
- Faulkes, Anthony, trans. (1987). Edda (1995 ed.). Everyman. ISBN 0-460-87616-3.
- Vigfússon, Guðbrandur (1874). An Icelandic-English Dictionary: Based on the Ms. Collections of the Late Richard Cleasby. Clarendon Press.
- Hellquist, E. (1922): Svensk etymologisk ordbok. C. W. K. Gleerups förlag, Lund. Archived 28 December 2019 at the Wayback Machine
- Hollander, M. Lee (Trans.) (2007). Heimskringla: History of the Kings of Norway (Archived 26 January 2017 at the Wayback Machine). University of Texas Press. ISBN 978-0-292-73061-8.
- Jónsson, Finnur (1913). Goðafræði Norðmanna og Íslendinga eftir heimildum. Hið íslenska bókmentafjelag.
- Larrington, Carolyne (Trans.) (1999). The Poetic Edda. Oxford World's Classics. ISBN 0-19-283946-2.
- Lindow, John (2001). Norse Mythology: A Guide to Gods, Heroes, Rituals, and Beliefs. Oxford University Press. ISBN 978-0-19-983969-8.
- Magnússon, Ásgeir Blöndal (1989). Íslensk orðsifjabók. Orðabók Háskólans.
- Orchard, Andy (1997). Dictionary of Norse Myth and Legend. Cassell. ISBN 978-0-304-34520-5.
- Scudder, Bernard (Trans.) (2001). Egil's Saga as collected in The Sagas of Icelanders. Penguin. ISBN 0-14-100003-1.
- Simek, Rudolf (1996). Dictionary of Northern Mythology (2007 ed.). D.S. Brewer. ISBN 978-0-85991-513-7.
- Thorpe, Benjamin (Trans.) (1907). The Elder Edda of Saemund Sigfusson. Norrœna Society.

Preceded by Odin	Mythological king of Sweden	Succeeded by Yngvi
