= Gastropnir =

Wall in Norse mythology

In Norse mythology, Gastropnir was in the realm of Menglöð.

Gastropnir is featured in Fjölsvinnsmál, as Svipdag conducts his mission to reach Menglöð. Svipdag walking up to the gate in the wall where he addresses a watchman called Fjölsviður. In the exchange between the two, Svipdagr asks what the wall is called. Fjolsvith replies that it is called Gastropnir and adds that he built it out of Leirbrimir's limbs.

== Other sources ==
- The Elder or Poetic Edda by Saemund Sigfusson with illustrations by W.G. Collingwood (originally published by Norroena Society, 1907; re-published by ADP Gauntlet, 2014, with Olive Bray, translator) ISBN 978-0692200650
