= Aurboða =

Norse mythical character

Aurboða (also Aurboda; Old Norse: [ˈɔurˌboðɑ] "gravel-bidder" or "gravel-offerer") is a jötunn in Norse mythology. She is married to the jötunn Gymir and is the mother of Gerðr.

== Name ==
The origin of the name Aurboða is unclear. The second part is certainly related to the Old Norse verb bjóða ('to offer'), but the meaning of the first element has been debated.

Most scholars connect it to the Old Norse aurr ('gravel, wet sand or earth, mud'), and translate Aurboða as 'gravel-bidder' or 'gravel-offerer'. This interpretation is encouraged by Aurboða's relationship with Gymir and Gerðr, who have also been regarded as chthonic beings in scholarship. An alternative theory is to translate Aurboða as 'gold-bidder' by comparing the first element to a word aur (from Latin aureus), as suggested by the depiction of Aurboða as a girl rather than a jötunn in Fjölsvinnsmál. According to philologist Rudolf Simek, however, the testimony of Fjölsvinnsmäl is probably secondary, and the root aur- is also found in the names of other jötnar and dwarfs such as Aurgelmir and Aurvangr.

In Fjölsvinnsmál (The Lay of Fjölsvinn), another figure named Aurboða is mentioned as one of the nine maidens sitting at the knees of their mistress the jötunn Menglöd.

The name Aurboða is sometimes anglicized as Aurboda.

== Attestation ==
In both Hyndluljód (The Lay of Hyndla) and Gylfaginning (Beguiling of Gylfi), Aurboða is portrayed as the mother of the jötunn Gerðr.

Frey possessed Gerd, she was the daughter of Gymir [corrected from Geymir]
Of the race of giants, and of Aurboda.

— Hyndluljód, 30:5–8, transl. J. Lindow, 2002.

There was someone called Gymir, and his wife Aurboda. She was of the race of mountain-giants. Gerd is their daughter, the most beautiful of all women.

— Gylfaginning, 35–37, transl. A. Faulkes, 1987.

== See also ==
- Angrboða, another female jötun
