= Heroine's Quest =

2013 adventure role-playing video game

Heroine's Quest: The Herald of Ragnarok
- Developer: Crystal Shard
- Director: Pieter Simoons
- Composers: Matthew Chastney, Dmitrii Zavorotny
- Engine: Adventure Game Studio
- Platforms: Windows, Linux, macOS
- Release: December 25, 2013: Windows & Linux; WW: December 25, 2013; macOS; WW: December 19, 2024
- Genres: Adventure, role-playing
- Mode: Single-player

Heroine's Quest: The Herald of Ragnarok is an adventure game/RPG hybrid developed by Dutch studio Crystal Shard, set in the world of the Poetic Edda and Norse Mythology.

== History ==
The game continued to publish new releases for a decade, although only 2 of the releases were detailed:

- The game was originally released at the end of 2013
- v1.1 and v1.2 came out in early 2014
- v1.2.3 came out at the end of 2016 (including a Russian language translation)
- v1.2.6 came out at the middle of 2017 (including a Spanish language, French language and Italian language translations)
- v1.2.7 came out at the end of 2021 with detailed fixes with v1.2.8 following it (including a Portuguese language translation)
- v1.2.9 came out at late 2023 with detailed fixes, then more than a year later in late 2024 was ported to macOS and translated to German language

== Plot ==
The city of Fornsigtuna is wrapped in an endless winter. Egther, the last of the frost giants on Midgard, is causing this in an effort to start Ragnarok, the end of the world in Norse myth. The jarl of Fornsigtuna has called for a hero to save the city, to which the player character responds. Barely surviving an initial attack by Thrivaldi, Egther's right-hand troll, the heroine travels between Fornsigtuna, the village of Munarvagr, and the otherworldy Svartalfheim. The troll is using strong-arm tactics to try to obtain the eyes of Thiassi, which would allow him to unleash Egther on the world. The heroine first foils these attempts, then has to gain the trust of the villagers to obtain the eyes for herself. Using these, she confronts Thrivaldi and Egther in a showdown at the frost giant's frozen castle of Gastropnir.

== Reception ==
Rock, Paper, Shotgun described it as a "beautiful game about selfless, old-fashioned heroism that brilliantly captures the spirit of Quest for Glory", PC Gamer claimed it "goes above and beyond most free adventure games/RPGs by offering "over 100 hand-painted backgrounds", voice acting, a neat auto-mapping function, along with optional sidequests and multiple ways to approach many quests", while Kotaku labelled it "about as perfect a tribute to Sierra's classic Quest for Glory series [...] as you could hope for".

RPG Codex ranks it in the Top 70 RPGs of all times.
