= Gymir (father of Gerðr) =

Character in Norse mythology

Gymir (Old Norse: [ˈɡymez̠]) is a jötunn in Norse mythology. He is the spouse of Aurboða, and the father of the beautiful jötunn Gerðr, who married the god Freyr. Gymir may be the same figure as Ægir, a personification of the sea or ocean, or a separate figure who shares the same name.

== Name ==
The meaning of the Old Norse name Gymir is unclear. Proposed translations include 'the earthly' (from Old Norse gumi), 'the wintry one' (from gemla), or 'the protector', the 'engulfer' (from geyma).

In Lokasenna (Loki's Flyting) and Skáldskaparmál (The Language of Poetry), Gymir is given by Snorri Sturluson as an alternative name for the divine personification of the sea Ægir. Rudolf Simek argues that it may be an erroneous interpretation of kennings in which different giant-names are used interchangeably.

Here it is implied that they are all the same, Ægir and Hler and Gymir ... What terms for sea are there? It is called mere, ocean (ægir), engulfer (gymir), roarer (hler), main, road, depth, salt, water, swell.

— Skáldskaparmál, 25, 60–61, transl. A. Faulkes, 1987.

== Attestations ==
=== Poetic Edda ===
In both Skírnismál (The Lay of Skírnir) and Gylfaginning (The Beguiling of Gylfi), Gymir is portrayed as the spouse of Aurboða; and from their union was born Gerðr.

There was someone called Gymir, and his wife Aurboda. She was of the race of mountain-giants. Gerd is their daughter, the most beautiful of all women.

— Gylfaginning, 35–37, transl. A. Faulkes, 1987.

=== Prose Edda ===
A verse from the 9th-century skald Ref Gestsson is quoted in the later Skáldskaparmál (The Language of Poetry).

Gymir’s spray-cold spae-wife [Rán] often brings the twisted-rope-bear [ship] into Ægir’s jaws [under the waves] where the wave breaks.

— Ref Gestsson, Skáld. 24–25, transl. A. Faulkes, 1987.

According to John Lindow, "the verse in question seems to say that the cold seeress of Gymir often transports the bear of twisted lines into the jaw of Ægir; that is, that the wave (Ægir’s daughters are the nine waves) often drives a ship deep into the water."

== Scholarly reception and interpretation ==
The name Gymir may indicate that Ægir was understood as the father of the beautiful jötunn Gerðr or indicate that two figures by the same name. Both the prose introduction to Lokasenna and Skáldskaparmál state that Ægir is also known as Gymir, the father of the jötunn Gerðr. Rudolf Simek argues that, if understood to be two different entities, this may stem from an erroneous interpretation of kennings in which different jötunn-names are used interchangeably.

Gymir has been seen as a chthonic deity, and Magnus Olsen argued that he was an earth giant from his interpretation of Skírnismál in light of the hieros gamos.
