= Grógaldr =

Old Norse poem

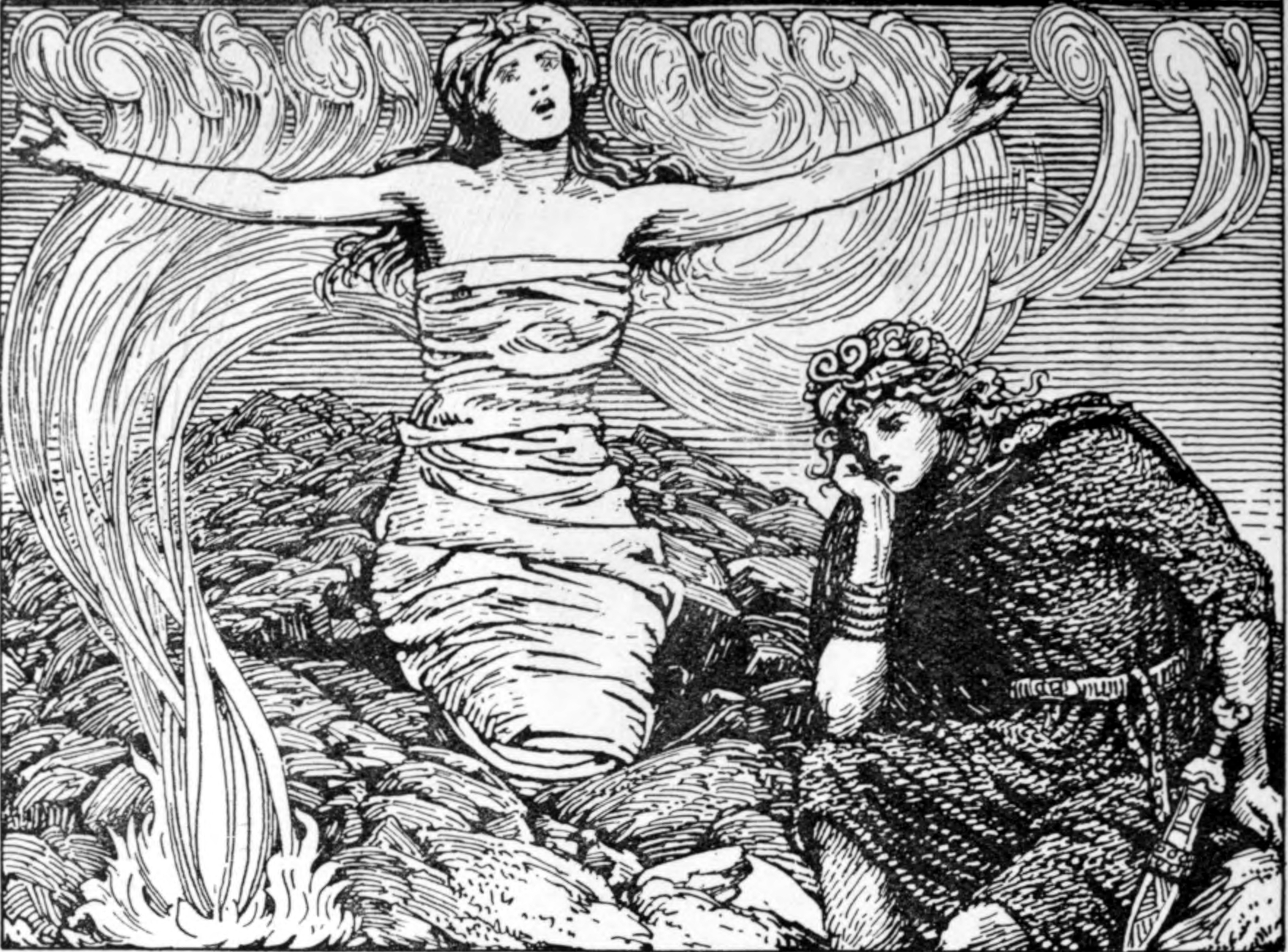
Groa's Incantation by W. G. Collingwood

Grógaldr or The Spell of Gróa is the first of two Old Norse poems, now commonly published under the title Svipdagsmál found in several 17th-century paper manuscripts with Fjölsvinnsmál. In at least three of these manuscripts, the poems are in reverse order and separated by a third eddic poem titled, Hyndluljóð. For a long time, the connection between the two poems was not realized, until in 1854 Svend Grundtvig pointed out a connection between the story told in Gróagaldr and the first part of the medieval Scandinavian ballad of Ungen Sveidal/Herr Svedendal/Hertig Silfverdal (TSB A 45, DgF 70, SMB 18, NMB 22). Then in 1856, Sophus Bugge noticed that the last part of the ballad corresponded to Fjölsvinnsmál. Bugge wrote about this connection in Forhandlinger i Videnskabs-Selskabet i Christiania 1860, calling the two poems together Svipdagsmál. Subsequent scholars have accepted this title.

Grógaldr is one of six eddic poems involving necromantic practice. It details Svipdagr's raising of his mother Groa, a völva, from the dead. Before her death, she requested him to do so if he ever required her help; the prescience of the völva is illustrated in this respect. The purpose of this necromancy was that she could assist her son in a task set him by his cunning stepmother. Svipdag's mother, Gróa, has been identified as the same völva who chanted a piece of Hrungnir's hone from Thor's head after their duel, as detailed in Snorri Sturluson's Prose Edda. There, Gróa is the wife of Aurvandil, a man Thor rescues from certain death on his way home from Jötunheim. The news of her husband's fate makes Gróa so happy, she forgets the charm, leaving the hone firmly lodged in Thor's forehead.

In the first stanza of this poem Svipdag speaks and bids his mother to arise from beyond the grave, at her burial mound, as she had bidden him do in life. The second stanza contains her response, in which she asks Svipdag why he has awakened her from death.

He responds by telling her of the task he has been set by his stepmother, i.e. to win the hand of Menglöð. He is all too aware of the difficulty of this: he presages this difficulty by stating that:

"she bade me travel to a place
where travel one cannot
to meet with fair Menglöð"

His dead mother agrees with him that he faces a long and difficult journey but does not attempt to dissuade him from it.

Svipdag then requests his mother to cast spells for his protection.

Groa then casts nine spells, or incantations.
