= Gymir =

Gymir may refer to:

- Ægir, a jötunn whose names include Gymir in Norse mythology
- Gymir (father of Gerðr), a jötunn who may or may not be the same figure as the above in Norse mythology
