= Víðópnir =

Mythological bird in Norse mythology

In Norse mythology, Víðópnir (Old Norse pronunciation: [ˈwiːðˌoːpnez̠]) is a mythological bird inhabiting the top of the Norse world tree, Yggdrasil – sometimes positioned on the brow of another cosmic bird.

== Representation ==
According to the eddic poem, Fjölsvinnsmál, Víðópnir or Víðófnir [ˈwiːðˌoːvnez̠] is a rooster that inhabits the crown of the world tree, variously represented as a falcon, sitting between the eyes of the cosmic eagle Hræsvelgr at the top of the tree of life, Mímameiðr (Mimi's Tree), a vast tree taken to be identical with the World Tree, Yggdrasil.

== Sources ==
Viðópnir occurs in one Norse medieval source aside from Fjölsvinnsmál, a tiny phrase in Snorri Sturluson's Eddu-brot, where it guards the gate to the lands where in Hél's Hel or Hell lies, the six-metre high Icelandic waterfalls of Gjallandi (literally, "the yelling"). Hel was one of the children of the trickster god Loki, and her kingdom was said to lie downward and northward.

Viðópnir seems rather identical to Veðrfölnir and the eagle.

== See also ==
- Veðrfölnir
