= Svipdagr =

Figure in Norse legend

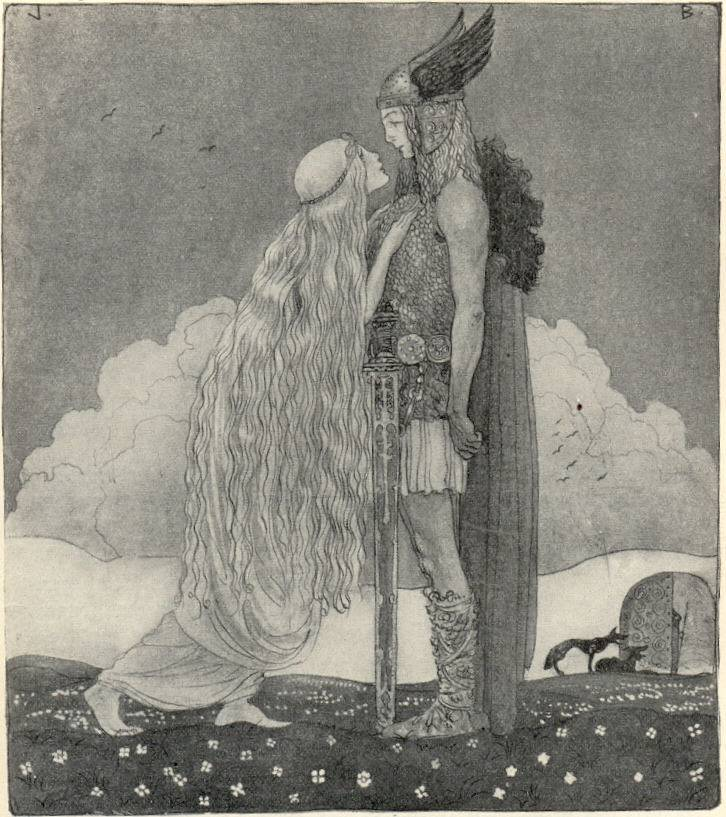
Freyja and Svipdag (1911) by John Bauer

Svipdagr (Old Norse: [ˈswipˌdɑɣz̠] "sudden day") is name of several apparently unrelated characters in Norse mythology and legend.

== Svipdagsmál ==
Svipdagr is the hero of two Old Norse Eddic poems, Grógaldr and Fjölsvinnsmál. Although these poems are separate, and do not always appear together in surviving manuscripts, it has been recognised since the 1850s that they tell complementary parts of a single story, and are referred to collectively by the invented name, Svipdagsmál, as suggested by Sophus Bugge. Although one of the main speakers in both poems, Svipdagr is not named until near the end of the second poem, Fjölsvinnsmál, when he reveals his identity.

=== Grógaldr ===
In the first poem, having been set an impossible task to meet the goddess Menglöð by his wicked stepmother, to meet the goddess Menglöð, Svipdagr summons the shade of his dead mother, Gróa, to chant magic spells on his behalf to protect him on his journey. (Gróa is not referred to as a völva (or seeress), but her role resembles that of völva characters in other poems of the Poetic Edda, such as the unnamed völva of Völuspá or Hyndla from Hyndluljóð. Furthermore, the name Gróa is given to a völva who appears in Skáldskaparmál in the Prose Edda, who attempted but failed to heal Thor after his battle with Hrungnir.)

Gróa casts nine spells for him and wishes him well on his quest, after which the poem ends.

=== Fjölsvinnsmál ===
At the beginning of the second poem, Svipdagr arrives at Menglöð's castle, where he is interrogated in a game of riddles by the watchman, from whom he conceals his true name (identifying himself as Vindkald(r) "Wind-Cold" apparently hoping to pass himself off as a frost giant). The watchman is named Fjölsviðr, one of the names of Odin given in Grímnismál 47, and he is accompanied by his wolf-hounds Geri and Gifr. After a series of eighteen questions and answers concerning the castle, its inhabitants, and its environment, Svipdagr ultimately learns that the gates will only open to one person: Svipdagr. On his revealing his identity and that his father was called Sólbjartr, the gates of the castle open and Menglöð rises to greet her expected lover, saying that their longing for each other will now come to an end.

=== Interpretation ===
Since the 19th century, following Jacob Grimm, Menglöð has been identified with the goddess Freyja in most scholarship. In his children's book Our Fathers' Godsaga, the Swedish scholar Viktor Rydberg identifies Svipdagr with Freyja's husband Óðr and with her companion Óttar who appears in Hyndluljóð. His reasons for doing so are outlined in the first volume of his Undersökningar i germanisk mythologi (1882).

Other scholars who have commented on these poems in detail include Hjalmar Falk (1893), B. Sijmons and Hugo Gering (1903), Olive Bray (1908), Henry Bellows (1923), Otto Höfler (1952), Lee M. Hollander (1962), Lotte Motz (1975), Einar Ólafur Sveinsson (1975), Carolyne Larrington (1999), and John McKinnell (2005).

== Gesta Danorum ==
In Book One of Gesta Danorum, a Latin history of the kings of Denmark by Saxo Grammaticus, a character known as Suibdagerus (often translated as Swipdag or Svipdag) is a King of Norway who subsequently becomes king of both Denmark and Sweden after killing Gram of Denmark.

Gram went to war with Suibdagerus for debauching his sister and daughter (neither of whom are named in the text, although Suibdagerus' later-mentioned wife is also the sister of Guthormus, Gram's son by Gro or Gróa). After Gram murdered Henricus, King of the Saxons, many Saxons joined Suibdagerus's side. Suibdagerus was able to kill Gram in battle and took over Sweden and Denmark.

Having won the war, Suibdagerus installed Guthormus as the puppet king of the Danes. Guthormus's half-brother, Hadingus (Gram's son by Signe rather than by Gro), went into exile, but eventually returned and killed Suibdagerus. Suibdagerus's son, Asmundus, continued the war in Sweden after Suibdagerus's death.

A different character appears in Book Six of Gesta Danorum. Here, Gegathus and Suibdavus are noble fighters in service of Huglecus, king of Ireland. They are the only men to stand by him when he is attacked by the forces of Hacon and Starcatherus, and together fought with strength like a whole army, but were nevertheless defeated.

=== Extracts of the text ===
Gesta Danorum, Book One, translated by Oliver Elton
But, while much busied with a war against Norway, which he [Gram] had taken up against King Swipdag for debauching his sister and his daughter, he heard from a messenger that Signe had, by Sumble's treachery, been promised in marriage to Henry, King of Saxony.
After this SWIPDAG, King of Norway, destroyed Gram, who was attempting to avenge the outrage on his sister and the attempt on his daughter's chastity. This battle was notable for the presence of the Saxon forces, who were incited to help Swipdag, not so much by love of him, as by desire to avenge Henry.
GUTHORM and HADDING, the son of Gram (Groa being the mother of the first and Signe of the second), were sent over to Sweden in a ship by their foster-father, Brage (Swipdag being now master of Denmark), and put in charge of the giants Wagnhofde and Hafle, for guard as well as rearing.
Swipdag, now that he had slain Gram, was enriched with the realms of Denmark and Sweden; and because of the frequent importunities of his wife he brought back from banishment her brother Guthorm, upon his promising tribute, and made him ruler of the Danes. But Hadding preferred to avenge his father rather than take a boon from his foe.
After this he prevailed over a great force of men of the East, and came back to Sweden. Swipdag met him with a great fleet off Gottland; but Hadding attacked and destroyed him. And thus he advanced to a lofty pitch of renown, not only by the fruits of foreign spoil, but by the trophies of his vengeance for his brother and his father. And he exchanged exile for royalty, for he became king of his own land as soon as he regained it.
Meanwhile, Asmund, the son of Swipdag, fought with Hadding to avenge his father.

The family tree of legendary Kings of the Danes, according to the Gesta Danorum (Books 1 to 7)

Kings of the Danes are marked with a crown (♕). Kings of the Swedes are marked with a dagger (†). Superscript numbers after a name indicate in which books of Gesta Danorum the individual is mentioned.

Humblus ♂ ^{(1)}
KEY
Angul ♂ ^{(1)}	♕ Dan I ♂ ^{(1)}	Grytha ♀ ^{(1)}	Marriage or coupling
Parent and child
The Angles	♕ Humblus ♂ ^{(1)}	♕ Lotherus ♂ ^{(1)}	King of the Saxons ♂ ^{(1)}	Succession by other or unclear means
Roarus ♂ ^{(1)}
Sigtrugus, King of the Swedes† ♂ ^{(1)}	♕ Skioldus ♂ ^{(1)}	Alvilda ♀ ^{(1)}
daughter of Roarus ♀ ^{(1)}	Bessus ♂ ^{(1)}
sister of Gram ♀ ^{(1)}	Gro ♀ ^{(1)}	♕ Gram† ♂ ^{(1)}	Sumblus, King of the Finns ♂ ^{(1)}
Wagnofthus ♂ ^{(1)}
Signe ♀ ^{(1)}	Henricus, King of the Saxons ♂ ^{(1)}	Haquinus, King of the Nitherians ♂ ^{(1)}
Harthgrepa ♀ ^{(1)}
♕Suibdagerus, King of Norway† ♂ ^{(1)}	sister of Guthormus ♀ ^{(1)}	♕Guthormus ♂ ^{(1)}	♕ Hadingus ♂ ^{(1,2,4,5)}	Regnilda ♀ ^{(1)}
Asmundus† ♂ ^{(1)}	Gunnilda ♀ ^{(1)}	Guthormus ♂ ^{(1)}
Ulvilda ♀ ^{(1,2)}	♕ Ubbo ♂ ^{(2)}
Henricus ♂ ^{(1)}	Uffo† ♂ ^{(1)}	Hundingus† ♂ ^{(1,2)}	Thorilda ♀ ^{(2)}	Scottus ♂ ^{(2)}
daughter of Uffo ♀ ^{(1)}	Regnerus† ♂ ^{(2)}	Suanhuita ♀ ^{(2)}	sisters of Suanhuita ♀♀ ^{(2)}	Andwan, King of the Hellespont ♂ ^{(2)}
Thoraldus ♂ ^{(2)}
♕ Frotho I ♂ ^{(2,5)}	daughter of Andwan ♀ ^{(2)}
Hothbrodus† ♂ ^{(2,3)}	♕ Haldanus I ♂ ^{(2)}	Roe ♂ ^{(2)}	Skato ♂ ^{(2)}
Thora ♀ ^{(2)}
♕ Helgo ♂ ^{(2,3)}	♕ Roe ♂ ^{(2)}
Athislus† ♂ ^{(2,3)}	Ursa ♀ ^{(2)}
King Gevarus ♂ ^{(2,3)}	♕ Rolvo Krake† ♂ ^{(2,3)}	Ruta ♀ ^{(2)}	Biarco ♂ ^{(2)}	Sculda ♀ ^{(2)}	♕ Hiarwarthus† ♂ ^{(2,3)}
♕ Hotherus† ♂ ^{(2,3)}	Nanna ♀ ^{(3)}	Herlecus ♂ ^{(3)}	Gericus ♂ ^{(3)}
former King of Britain ♂ ^{(3)}	mother of the King of Britain ♀ ^{(3)}	a slave ♂ ^{(3)}	a bondmaid ♀ ^{(3)}	♕ Roricus Slyngebond ♂ ^{(3)}	Gerwendillus ♂ ^{(3)}
King of Britain ♂ ^{(3,4)}	Queen of Britain ♀ ^{(3,4)}	Gerutha ♀ ^{(3,4)}	Horwendillus ♂ ^{(3,4)}	Fengo ♂ ^{(3,4)}
foster sister of Amlethus ♀ ^{(3,4)}	daughter of the King of Britain ♀ ^{(3,4)}	Amlethus ♂ ^{(3,4)}	Herminthruda, Queen of Scotland ♀ ^{(4)}	♕ Wiglecus ♂ ^{(4)}
son of Amlethus ♂ ^{(4)}	♕Wermundus ♂ ^{(4)}	Frowinus, governor of Sleswik ♂ ^{(4)}
♕ Uffo, aka Olavus the Gentle ♂ ^{(4)}	daughter of Frowin ♀ ^{(4)}	Keto ♂ ^{(4)}	Wigo ♂ ^{(4)}
♕ Dan II ♂ ^{(4)}
♕ Huglecus ♂ ^{(4)}
♕ Frotho II, the Vigorous ♂ ^{(4)}
♕ Dan III ♂ ^{(4)}
Craca ♀ ^{(5)}	Regnerus ♂ ^{(5)}	Bracus ♂ ^{(5)}	♕ Fridlevus I, the Swift ♂ ^{(4,5)}	Hun, King of the Huns ♂ ^{(5)}	Hun ♂ ^{(5)}
Gøtarus, King of Norway ♂ ^{(5)}	Westmarus ♂ ^{(5)}	Colo ♂ ^{(5)}	Gøtwara ♀ ^{(5)}
Rollerus ♂ ^{(5)}	Ericus the Shrewd-spoken† ♂ ^{(5,6)}	Gunwara the Fair ♀ ^{(5)}	Alvilda ♀ ^{(5)}	♕ Frotho III ♂ ^{(5,6)}	Hanunda ♀ ^{(5)}	Grep (eldest of three) ♂ ^{(5)}	11 other sons (two named Grep) ♂♂ ^{(5)}
Hythin, King of Tellemark ♂ ^{(6)}	Alvo ♂ ^{(5)}	Ofura ♀ ^{(5)}	Arngrimus ♂ ^{(5)}	Grubbus ♂ ^{(6)}	♕ Hiarnus ♂ ^{(6)}	Amundus, King of Norway ♂ ^{(6)}
child of Hythin ^{(6)}	Haldanus† ♂ ^{(6)}	12 sons, including Angantir ♂♂ ^{(5)}	Ano ♂ ^{(6)}	Iuritha ♀ ^{(6)}	♕ Fridlevus II ♂ ^{(6)}	Frogertha ♀ ^{(6)}
Hanevus, King of Saxony ♂ ^{(6)}	Suertingus, King of Saxony ♂ ^{(6)}	Olavus ♂ ^{(6)}	♕ Frotho IV ♂ ^{(6)}
Siward† ^{(6,7)}	sons of Suertingus ♂♂ ^{(6)}	sister of the sons of Suertingus ♀ ^{(6)}	♕ Ingellus ^{(6,7)}	Helga ^{(6)}	Helge ^{(6)}	Asa ^{(6)}
Frode ^{(6,7)}	Fridleif ^{(6,7)}	Ingild ^{(6,7)}	♕ Olavus I ^{(6,7)}	Karl, governor of Gothland ^{(7)}
Ulfhild ^{(7)}	♕ Frotho V ^{(7)}	Hather, a chief ^{(7)}	♕ Haraldus I ^{(7)}	Signe ^{(7)}
Erik† ^{(7)}	Thorhild ^{(7)}	♕ Haldanus II Biargramm† ^{(7)}	Harald ^{(7)}
Asmund ^{(7)}
Kings of Norway

Genealogical information is derived from Oliver Elton's 1905 translation, The First Nine Books of the Danish History of Saxo Grammaticus, via Wikisource. Name spellings are from the Latin critical edition by Olrik and Raeder (1931). Regnal numbers, which do not appear in the original text, are included for clarity and taken from the engraving Veræ effigies regum omnium by Erico Olai Tormio.

Legendary titles
Preceded by Gram	King of the Swedes	Succeeded by Asmund
Preceded by Gram	King of the Danes (first reign)	Succeeded by Guthorm
Preceded by Guthorm	King of the Danes (second reign)	Succeeded by Hading

== Hrólf Kraki's saga ==
A figure named Svipdagr is one of the champions of the legendary Danish king Hrólfr Kraki. In Hrólfs saga kraka, the third part is a side-story that follows Svipdagr from his youth to his joining Hrólfr Kraki's service. He is the son of a farmer named Svip, and has two brothers named Beigad and Hvitserk (who also later become two of Hrólfr Kraki's champions).

At the age of eighteen, Svipdagr left home and went to the court of King Adils of Sweden. His confidence angered the berserkers in Adils' employ. With Adils' permission, the berserkers challenged Svipdagr to fight in a series of one-on-one combats but Svipdagr killed four of them. Adils, angered at the loss of his fighters, ordered his men to kill Svipdagr, but Queen Yrsa brokered peace between them. Instead, Adils asked Svipdagr to be his bodyguard. The surviving berserkers were exiled, but began raiding the country. Later, Adils and Svipdagr planned to attack the berserkers, but Adils chose not to enter the fight until he knew whether Svipdagr or the berserkers would win. Svipdagr was badly wounded in several places and lost an eye, but was rescued by his brothers Beigad and Hvitserk. He decided to leave Adils' service and instead join King Hrolf in Denmark.

Later, Svipdagr helped Hrolf to infiltrate Adils' court to reclaim treasure that had belonged to Hrolf's father Helgi.

== Heimskringla ==
Two figures named Svipdagr appear in Snorri Sturlusson's Ynglinga saga, the first part of Heimskringla, Snorri's history of the kings of Sweden and Norway.

Two brothers named Svipdagr and Geigaðr are champions in service to king Hugleik. At the battle between King Hugleik and King Haki at Fyrisvellir, Svipdagr and Geigaðr were captured after six of Haki's champions attacked each of them. Hugleik and his sons were killed.

A man named Svipdagr blindi (the Blind) was the foster-father of Ingjaldr hinn illráði. When Ingjald was a child, he was beaten in a boy's game by Alf, the son of King Yngvarr of Fjärdhundraland, and began to weep bitterly. Svipdagr said this was a shame and cut out a wolf's heart for Ingjald to eat, after which Ingjald was the fiercest and worst-tempered of men. Svipdagr's sons, Fólkviðr/Gautviðr and Hulviðr, helped Ingjald to kill six other kings in order to expand his kingdom. Svipdagr and his sons later supported Ingjald when he was defeated in battle by King Granmar of Södermanland.

== Prose Edda and Anglo-Saxon royal genealogies ==
Svipdagr appears in the Anglo-Saxon royal genealogies of the Kings of Deira.

In the Prologue of the Prose Edda, Snorri Sturluson mentions Svipdagr as the name given in Old Norse to Svebdegg, son of Sigar, son of Vitrgils, son of Veggdegg, who was made ruler of East Saxony by his father Odin. That is, according to Snorri Sturlusson's euhemerised account, Svebdegg/Svipdagr was a great-great-grandson of Odin. He was also a cousin of Hengest.

The same figure, referred to as Swebdæg or Swæbdæg, appears in substantially the same genealogy in the Anglo-Saxon Chronicle and the Anglian collection. (In these genealogies, Vitrgils is skipped over and Siggar or Sigegar is made the son of Wægdæg, i.e. Veggdegg.) The genealogies in the Anglo-Saxon Chronicle and the Anglian collection then continue on to further generations, through Swebdæg's son Siggeāt or Siggeot, down to Aella, the first historically-documented king of Deira.
