= Svipdagsmál =

Old Norse poem

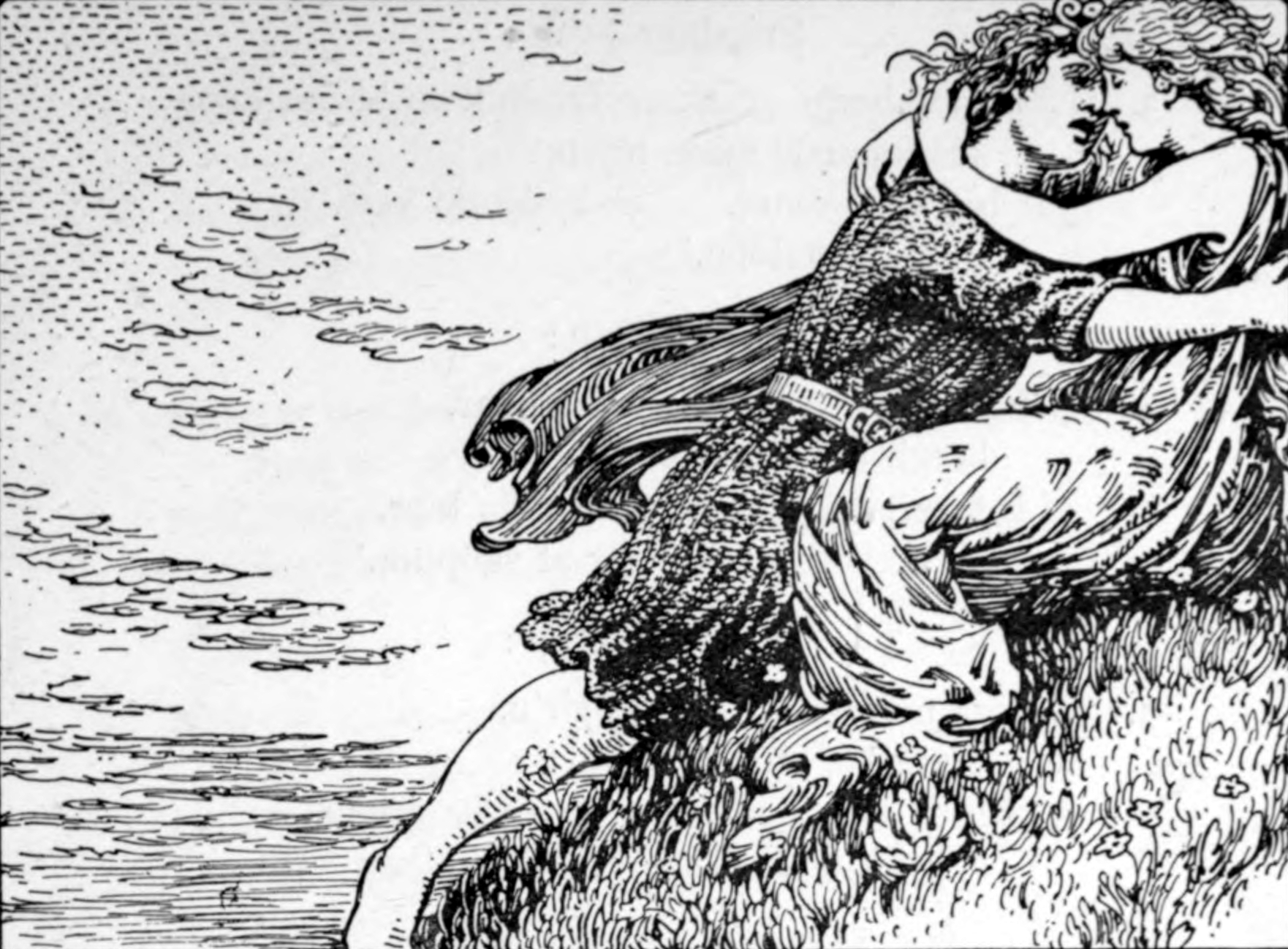
Svipdagr meets his beloved in this illustration by W. G. Collingwood.

Svipdagsmál (Old Norse: [ˈswɪpˌdaɣsˌmɒːl], 'The Lay of Svipdagr') is an Old Norse poem, sometimes included in modern editions of the Poetic Edda, comprising two poems, The Spell of Gróa and The Lay of Fjölsviðr.

The two works are grouped since they have a common narrator, Svipdagr. Moreover, they would appear to have a common origin since they are closely similar in use of language, structure, style and metre (ljóðaháttr). These two poems are found in several 17th-century paper manuscripts. In at least three of these manuscripts, the poems are in reverse order and separated by a third Eddic poem titled Hyndluljóð. For a long time, the connection between the two poems was not realized, until in 1854 Svend Grundtvig pointed out a connection between the story told in Grógaldr and the first part of the medieval Scandinavian ballad of Ungen Sveidal/Herr Svedendal/Hertig Silfverdal (TSB A 45, DgF 70, SMB 18, NMB 22). Then in 1856, Sophus Bugge noticed that the last part of the ballad corresponded to Fjölsvinnsmál. Bugge wrote about this connection in Forhandlinger i Videnskabs-Selskabet i Christiania 1860, calling the two poems together Svipdagsmál. Subsequent scholars have accepted this title.

== Poems ==
=== Grógaldr ===
In the first poem, the young Svipdagr has been compelled to come to Menglöð by his cruel stepmother. To accomplish this seemingly impossible task, he summons the shade of his mother, Gróa, a völva or witch, to aid him in this task. She casts nine spells (a significant number in Norse mythology).

=== Fjölsvinnsmál ===
In the second poem, Svipdag, having survived the rigours of the journey, is confronted by the eponymous giant watchman, Fjölsviðr. Fjölsviðr is one of the names of the principal of the gods of Asgard, Odin. Fjölsviðr tells him to go away, while asking him his name; Svipdagr wisely conceals his name. A game consisting of question and answer riddles ensues, wherein Svipdagr learns that Menglöð lives in the castle guarded by the Fjölsviðr, and that the castle may not be entered by any save one: Svipdagr. He gives his true name and the gates are opened and Menglöð greets her saviour.

== Theories ==
To date, scholarship has reached no consensus on the meaning of the poems, producing a number of competing theories. Jacob Grimm (1835) identified Menglöð (Old Norse "the one who takes pleasure in jewels") with Freyja. Viktor Rydberg (1889) identified Svipdagr as Freyja's husband Óðr, Menglöð herself as Freyja, and Fjölsviðr representing Odin. Hjalmar Falk (1893) is inclined to see the influence of Grail-poems. Jan de Vries (1941) concluded that the author had formed an Eddic poem out of a fairy story of an enchanted princess and her lover, through borrowing and invention. Otto Höfler (1952) and F.R. Schröder (1966) discerned elements of the myth and ritual which treat the reawakening of the earth beneath the rays of the sun each spring. Einar Ólafur Sveinsson (1975) suggests that the substance of the poem comes from the Irish legend of Art mac Cuinn. Lotte Motz (1975) argues that the poem represents the initiation of a young hero into a mother-goddess cult, identifying Svipdagr's mother Gróa with his lover, Menglöð, based primarily on a limited interpretation of the word mögr in Fjölsvinnsmál 47. More recently, John McKinnell (2005) has stated: "There is no need to identify Menglöð with Gróa, and the attempt to see Gróa’s spells as an initiatory ritual distorts the obvious meaning of several of them."

== Notes ==
=== Bibliography ===
- Cumpstey, Ian (2016). English translation of the ballad: Sir Svedendal in The Faraway North. Skadi Press ISBN 978-0-9576120-2-0.
- Falk, Hjalmar (1893). "Om Svipdagsmål". Arkiv för nordisk filologi: 311–362. Lund: Berlingska Boktryckeri.
- McKinnell, John (2005). Meeting the Other in Old Norse Myth and Legend. D.S. Brewer ISBN 1-84384-042-1.
- Orchard, Andy (1997). Dictionary of Norse Myth and Legend. Cassell. ISBN 978-0-304-34520-5.
- Rydberg, Viktor (1889) translated by Rasmus B. Anderson. Teutonic Mythology. London: Swan Sonnenschein & Co.
- Simek, Rudolf (2007) translated by Angela Hall. Dictionary of Northern Mythology. D.S. Brewer ISBN 0-85991-513-1.
- Sveinsson, Einar Ólafur (1975). "Svipdag's Long Journey: Some Observations on Grógaldr and Fjölsvinnsmál". Hereditas: 298–319. Ed. Bo Almqvist et al. Dublin: Folklore of Ireland Society.
