= Fjölsvinnsmál =

Poem in Old Norse

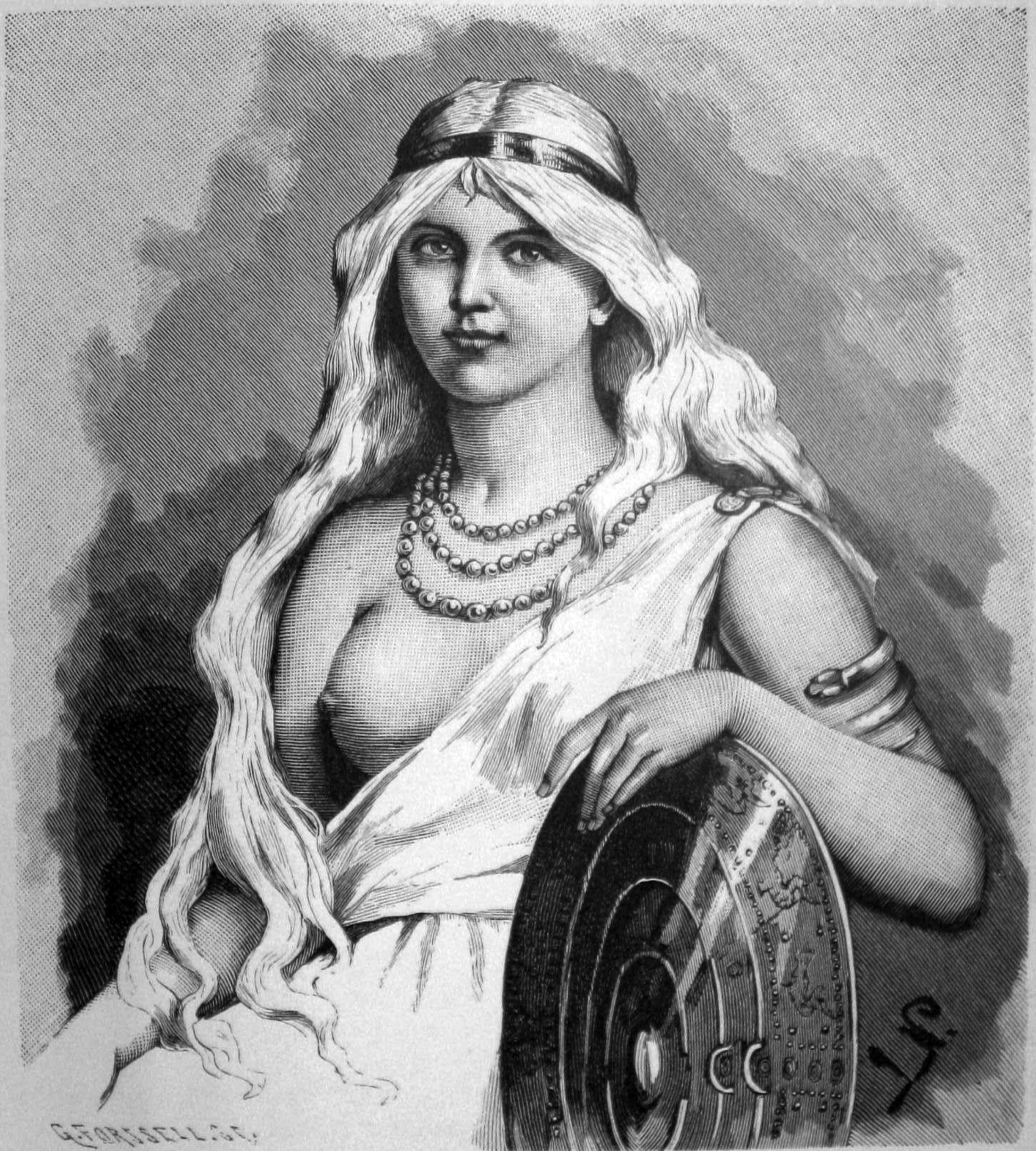
Menglöð.

Fjölsvinnsmál (Old Norse: 'The Lay of Fjölsvinn') is the second of two Old Norse poems commonly published under the title Svipdagsmál "The Lay of Svipdagr". These poems are found together in several 17th-century paper manuscripts with Fjölsvinnsmál. In at least three of these manuscripts, the poems appear in reverse order and are separated by a third eddic poem titled Hyndluljóð. For a long time, the connection between the two poems was not realized, until in 1854 Svend Grundtvig pointed out a connection between the story told in Gróagaldr and the first part of the medieval Scandinavian ballad of Ungen Sveidal/Herr Svedendal/Hertig Silfverdal (TSB A 45, DgF 70, SMB 18, NMB 22). Then in 1856, Sophus Bugge noticed that the last part of the ballad corresponded to Fjölsvinnsmál. Bugge wrote about this connection in Forhandlinger i Videnskabs-Selskabet i Christiania 1860, calling the two poems together Svipdagsmál. Subsequent scholars have accepted this title.

In the first poem, Svipdagr enlists the aid of his dead mother, Gróa, a witch, to assist him in the completion of a task set by his cruel stepmother.

At the commencement of Fjölsvinnsmál, Svipdagr has arrived at a castle on a mountain top. There he encounters a watchman, Fjölsviðr, who tells him to be gone before asking him his name. Svipdagr conceals it, only revealing it later in the poem.

A game of question and answers ensues, wherein Svipdagr learns that Menglöð lives in the castle guarded by Fjölsviðr, and that the castle may not be entered by any save one: Svipdagr. He gives his true name and the gates are opened and Menglöð greets Svipdagr.
