= Hrímgrímnir =

Norse mythical character

Hrímgrímnir (Old Norse: [ˈhriːmˌɡriːmnez̠], 'frost-masked') is a jötunn in Norse mythology. He is invoked by Freyr's servant Skírnir as he tries to coerce the beautiful jötunn Gerðr on his master's behalf.

== Name ==
The Old Norse name Hrímgrímnir has been translated as 'frost-masked'.

== Attestations ==
In Skírnismál (The Lay of Skírnir), after Gerðr refuses to marry Freyr, his messenger Skírnir threatens her with a curse involving her marriage to Hrímgrímnir in Hel:

[Skírnir:]
Hrímgrímnir is the name of the giant who shall possess you [Gerðr],
Down below Nágrind [the gate to Hel’s realm].
There let wretches on the roots of the tree
Give you goat piss.
A better drink you will never get,
Maiden, from your mouth,
Maiden, to your mouth.

— Skírnismál, 35, trans. J. Lindow, 2002.

Hrímgrímnir is also mentioned in the þulur among fellow jötnar but is not otherwise found elsewhere.

== Theories ==
Scholar John Lindow comments that Hrímgrímnir is evidently a "part of something bigger"; if Gerðr refuses Skírnir's offer, she will "be denied all ordinary sexual congress", resulting in social consequences—even though she would be married, she would live in social exile.
