= Weapons of Norse mythology =

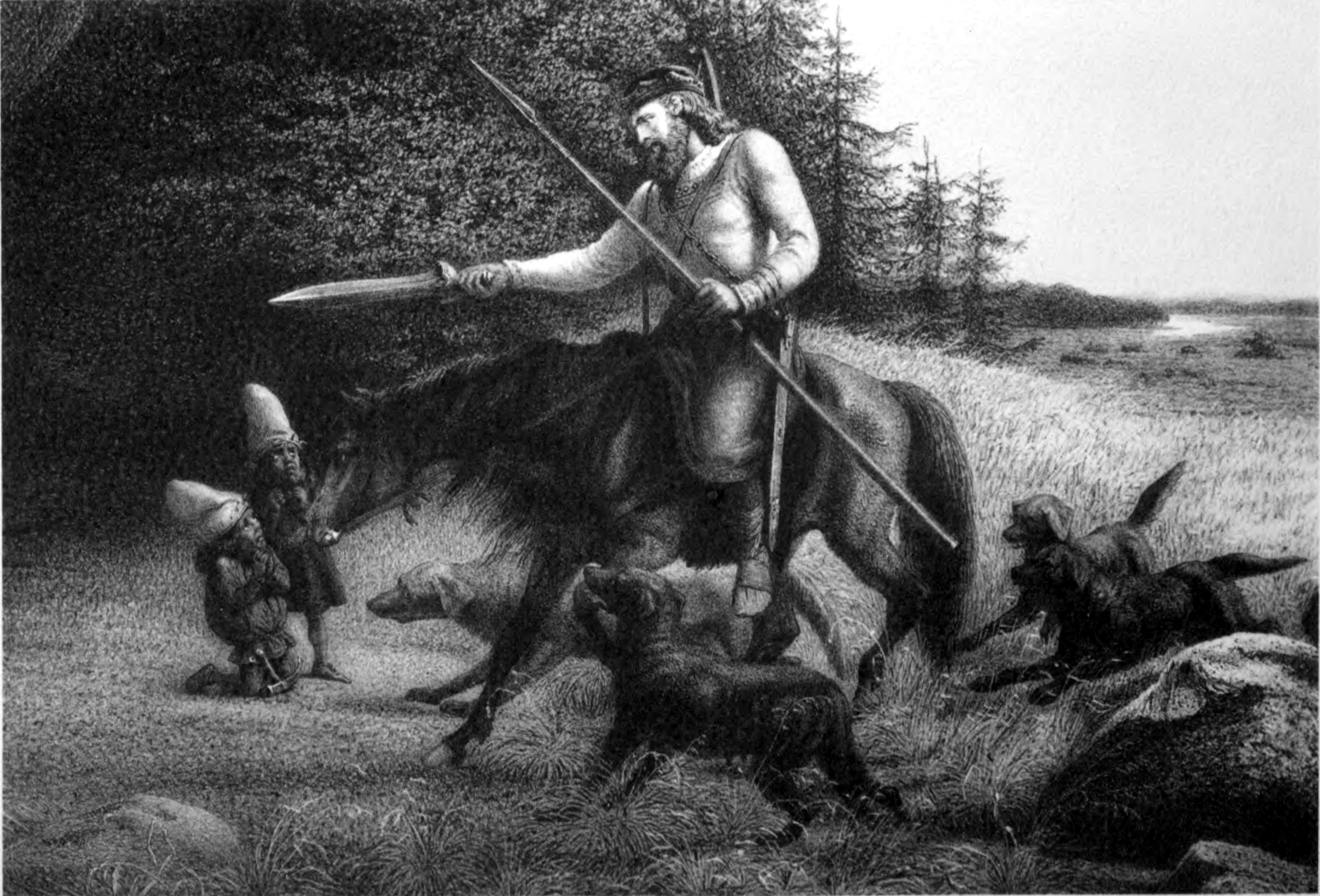
King Svafrlami compelling two dwarves to forge for him the sword Tyrfing

Norse mythology contains references to various named weapons wielded by specific characters. The oldest references sometimes offer nothing except a name for the weapon, but some of them include more detail on the weapon and what makes it unique, such as Thor's famous hammer Mjölnir. These weapons have often been expanded upon in later cultural adaptations that involve Norse mythology. For example, Richard Wagner's Ring cycle of operas adds that Wotan (Odin)'s spear Gungnir is inscribed with all the agreements and treaties which Wotan has made with various other beings, and is the record and source of his power.

== Angrvaðil ==
Angrvaðil (Anglicised as Angervadil or Angurvadel) is a sword from Þorsteins saga Víkingssonar.

In Þorsteins saga, Angrvaðil was originally one of the three treasures (with a magic ring and magic drinking horn) belonging to Kol Kroppinbak (Kol the Hunchback), a giant wizard who had conquered India. Kol used his magic to ensure that no iron could harm any of his children, except for Angrvaðil. When Kol died, the sword passed to his eldest child, Birni Bluetooth. In Hålogaland, Birni fought two wardens of that country, Vífil and Véseti; Véseti struck Birni on the hand with a club, leading him to drop the sword Angrvaðil, which Vífil snatched up and killed Birni with.

Vífil wore the sword for many years, until he eventually passed it onto his son Víking so that he could fight Kol's third child, Harek. Víking used Angrvaðil to strike Harek's iron skull, splitting his body down the middle until the sword stuck in the ground to the hilt. Víking then kept the sword for many years, until he eventually passed it onto his own son Thorstein when Víking's sons fled the kingdom for killing one of the king's sons.

Thorstein used Angrvaðil to defeat many enemies, but when he fought his nemesis Jökul, Thorstein fell from a crag on a riverbank and Angrvaðil fell into the river. The troll-woman Skellinefja approached as Thorstein lay dying and promised to heal him if he would agree to marry her; he accepted on condition that she also brought back his sword, which she did. Once they made their agreement, the troll-woman revealed that she was actually the princess Ingibjörg, who had been enchanted with a troll's shape, and that by agreeing to marry her he had broken the spell.

Thorstein eventually came up against a man, Ötunfaxa (or Faxa), who was so resistant to iron that not even Angrvaðil could scratch him. He tracked down Thorstein after Thorstein used the sword to kill his brother Úfi. For this fight, Thorstein was advised to give Angrvaðil to his foster-brother Angantyr, while he fought Faxa with a club. This measure did not help, however, and Thorstein would have been drowned without the assistance of the dwarf Sindri.

Finally, Thorstein used the sword Angrvaðil to defeat Jökul and chop off his hand, leading to him being called Jökul One-handed.

After Thorstein died, the sword passed to his daughter Véfreyja.

== Dáinsleif ==
Dáinsleif ("Dáinn's Heirloom") is king Högni's sword, according to Snorri Sturluson's account of the battle known as the Hjaðningavíg. Högni claims it is similar to the sword Tyrfing as far as killing a person every time it is drawn.

When Heðinn offers him compensation for the abduction of his daughter, Högni replies:

Thou hast made this offer over-late, if thou wouldst make peace: for now I have drawn Dáinsleif, which the dwarves made, and which must cause a man's death every time it is bared, nor ever fails in its stroke; moreover, the wound heals not if one be scratched with it.

— Arthur Gilchrist Brodeur translation, Skáldskaparmál, Chapter 50

=== In culture ===
- Several games in the Castlevania series feature Dáinsleif as a usable weapon.
- In Final Fantasy Type-0, the first chapter ends with the player fighting a "l'Cie" named Qun'mi, who pilots a magitek weapon called Dáinsleif.
- Genshin Impact, a 2020 action role-playing game, features a character named Dainsleif.
- Legend of Mana, a Square role-playing game, features a monster named Dainsleif.
- The anime franchise Senki Zesshō Symphogear features an ancient sword called Dáinsleif.
- In Mobile Suit Gundam: Iron-Blooded Orphans, the Dáinsleif is a railgun that rapidly fires rod projectiles.
- In Black Summoner, Dáinsleif is a sword made for Gerard Fragarach by Kelvin Celsius.
- For Honor, there is a Viking finisher called Dáinsleif.
- Black Clover, Zenon Zogratis, uses Dáinsleif as an ultimate finishing-move
- In Monster Hunter Frontier Z, Dáinsleif is a pair of Dual Blades.
- In Odin Sphere, Dáinsleif was featured as a playable character with Oswald's special skill, rather than being a physical weapon.
- Valvrave the Liberator, a 2013 mecha anime, features a giant robot which is rechristened Dainsrave after being captured by Cain Dressel.
- In Gambonanza, a 2026 chess-inspired roguelike, one of the gambits, Dainsleif's Gambit, is named after this sword.
- In Sovereign Tower, a 2026 management RPG, Dáinsleif is a demon inhabited sword wielded by Lady Edith of Avalon.

== Dragvendil ==
Dragvendil is a magic sword that appears in Ketils saga hœngs and Gríms saga loðinkinna. In Ketils saga, it is referred to as the best of all swords. Fifa, Flaug and Hremsa are three magical arrows from the same sagas. In Ketils saga, Ketil was either given Dragvendil by the troll Bruni and used it to kill Gusir, King of the Sami, after which he took the three arrows from Gusir's body; or Bruni gave him the magical arrows, which he used to kill Gusir, after which he took the sword from Gusir's body.

Jackson Crawford suggested that the elements of the name of the sword could mean "draw" (as in, to draw a sword) and "Vandal", but this is unclear. Bernhard Kahle suggested the name Dragvendil could mean "dragging sword" and could refer to it being so long that it drags on the ground when sheathed.

== Gram ==
Gram (Old Norse: Gramr, "ill-tempered"), is a magical sword wielded by the hero Sigurd. He uses it to slay Fafnir, a dwarf transformed into a dragon. It is primarily used by the Völsungs in the Völsung Cycle; however, it is also seen in other legends, such as the Thidrekssaga in which it is wielded by Hildebrand. In the Middle High German epic poem Nibelungenlied, it is called Balmung.

== Gungnir ==
Gungnir (/ˈɡʌŋ.nɪər/, "the rocking") is the spear of the god Odin. It is said to always hit the target of the attacker. It is depicted in the Poetic Edda poem Völuspá, in the Sigrdrífumál, Chapter 51 of the Gylfaginning, and the Skáldskaparmál.

== Hǫfuð ==
Hǫfuð ("man-head", Norwegian hovud, Danish hoved, Swedish huvud and Icelandic höfuð) is the sword of the Æsir Heimdall. It is mentioned in Gylfaginning chapter 26:

Anthony Faulkes's edition:

Heimdalar sverð er kallat Hǫfuð.

Arthur Brodeur's translation:

Heimdallr's sword is called Head.

The Skáldskaparmál also mentions a mysterious myth about Heimdall's head and sword in its eighth chapter, seemingly saying Heimdall was "pierced by a man's head" (a reference to his own sword? to a human head itself colliding with him?).

== Hrotti ==
Hrotti is a sword in the Völsung cycle (Fáfnismál, Völsunga saga, 20). It was a part of Fáfnir's treasure, which Sigurðr took after he slew the dragon. Kemp Malone suggested that Hrotti was etymologically related to Hrunting, Beowulf's sword.

== Lævateinn ==
Lævateinn is a weapon crafted by Loki, mentioned in the Poetic Edda poem Fjölsvinnsmál. It is said to be the only weapon that can defeat Viðofnir, a bird that sits atop Mímameiðr, the tree of life. Scholars debate and are unsure what exact type of weapon was meant. The poem does not clarify if Lævateinn was ever actually used for this purpose, leaving such a feat in the potential future.

== Løgthi ==
Løgthi is the sword of the legendary Danish king Olo the Vigorous according to Book 7 of Gesta Danorum by Saxo Grammaticus. He used it when still young to single-handedly defeat the brothers Hiale (Latin: Hiallus) and Skate (Latin: Scatus), who would kidnap and ravish young maidens, as well as ten of their followers. By this deed, Olo won the hand of the princess Esa.

== Løvi (Snyrtir) ==
Løvi was the sword used by Bödvar Bjarki (Latin: Biarco) according to Book 2 of Gesta Danorum by Saxo Grammaticus. In Saxo's Latin translation and adaptation of Bjarkamál, preserved in the same book, the same sword is called Snyrtir. Løvi is described as "a sword of wonderful sharpness and unusual length", and in the Bjarkamál section as a Teutonic sword (Latin: Theutonico ... ense).

Løvi was the sword that Bjarki used to kill Agnar, son of Ingild, in a holmgang. As the man of higher status, Agnar had the right of first strike; he struck Bjarki on the head with the sword Høchingus, and the blow was strong enough to cleave the helmet and cut the skin, but the edge did not hold and the sword was stuck in Bjarki's visor. In return, Bjarki struck with Løvi, the fine edge of which passed through Agnar's body; it clove asunder his left arm and part of his left side and his right foot, then smote deep into his ribs. Agnar died with a smile on his face.

In the Bjarkamál translation, Bjarki boasts that he later used the sword to stab the young son of a king through the heart, saying: "The mailed metal could not avail him, nor his sword, nor the smooth target-boss; so keen was the force of my steel, it knew not how to be stayed by obstacles."

== Lyusingus and Huytingus ==
Lyusingus and Huytingus (referred to in some translations as Hwyting) are the swords used by Haldanus the Strong, son of Borcarus, in Book 7 of Gesta Danorum by Saxo Grammaticus. Huytingus was so named because of the whiteness of its well-whetted point. The swords originally belonged to Halfdan's maternal grandfather, Regnerus the king of the Northmen, but were passed down to Haldanus by his mother Drota. Haldanus used one of these swords, wrapped in rags, in his duel against his half-brother Hildigerus, not realising they were related. Later he slew the Saxon Siwar at his wedding by running him through, before marrying the bride Guritha himself.

== Mistilteinn ==
Mistilteinn (Old Norse, lit. 'Mistletoe'; cf. Old English: Mistiltán; Old Swedish: Misteltein; Swedish: Mistelten) is Hrómundr Gripsson's sword in Hrómundar saga Gripssonar, a legendary saga from Iceland.

Mistilteinn first belonged to Þráinn, who had been king in Valland before he retired in his burial mound with his wealth.

The Danish king Óláfr and his men, among whom Hrómundr Gripsson, learnt about that and found the barrow. Þráinn, who had become a draugr (living dead), was sitting inside. No one but Hrómundr dared to enter. After a long and fierce fight, he defeated Þráinn and took his treasure, especially his sword, with which Þráinn had killed four hundred and twenty men, including the Swedish king Semingr.

Hrómundr used Mistilteinn during the battle between Óláfr and two Swedish kings both named Haldingr. He killed Helgi inn frækni (the Valiant), who had slain his brothers. He then lost Mistilteinn in the water out of witchcraft. He deeply felt this loss but soon recovered his sword, which was found in the stomach of a pike. But Mistilteinn was of no help when he fought king Haldingr, whom he eventually killed with a club.

In one version of Norse mythology, Odin's son Baldr was prophesized to die, so his mother Frigg, Odin's wife, forced everything in the Nine Realms to swear not to harm him, all with the exception of the plant mistletoe, which was deemed too weak to pose a threat. One day, Baldr was showing off his invincibility by having all the Æsir gods hurl things at him. However, his blind brother Höðr was left out of the revelry. Odin's sworn brother Loki, jealous of Baldr's good looks and charisma, handed Hod a weapon he fashioned from mistletoe, Mistilteinn, and encouraged him to join in on the fun. Höðr then threw the weapon at his brother and struck him dead. Odin was so distraught at his favored son's death that he killed Höðr on the spot.

== Mjölnir ==
Mjölnir is Thor's hammer, used both as a weapon and as a spiritual focus with which to perform divine acts.

== Riðill ==
Riðill (sometimes anglicised to Rithill or Ridill) or Refil is a sword possessed by the dwarf Regin.

Regin then approached Fafnir and cut out his heart with a sword named Ridill, and afterwards drank blood from his wound.

— Benjamin Thorpe translation, Fáfnismál 26

Riðill appears in the Fáfnismál, an eddic poem in the Poetic Edda. Regin's older brother Fáfnir had killed their father Hreiðmarr and taken his treasure. Regin goads the hero Sigurd into killing Fáfnir, who was transformed into a serpent or dragon at the time. After Fáfnir's defeat, Regin draws his own sword Riðill and uses it to cut out Fafnir's heart. The two roast the heart for them to eat.

The Volsunga saga was likely later than and dependent on the Fáfnismál, and recounts a similar story. However, in it, it is Sigurd himself who uses Riðill (rather than his sword Gram) to cut out Fáfnir's heart.

Reginn had that sword which was named Refill. So he [Reginn] fled away, and Fáfnir went up to Gnita Heath, and made himself a lair, and turned himself into a serpent, and laid him down upon the gold.

— Arthur Gilchrist Brodeur translation, Skáldskaparmál, Chapter 40

The story also appears in the Skáldskaparmál of the Prose Edda, but the name of the sword is given as Refil or Refill there.

== Skofnung ==
Skofnung (Old Norse: Skǫfnungr) is the sword of legendary Danish king Hrólf Kraki that appears in Hrólfs saga kraka. It was renowned for supernatural sharpness and hardness. It also appears in Laxdæla saga and Kormáks saga.

== Skrep ==
Skrep or Screp is the sword of the legendary Danish kings Wermund and Uffo according to Book 4 of the Gesta Danorum by Saxo Grammaticus. It was sharp enough to cut through anything, and could not be stopped by any shield.

But the king had a sword of extraordinary sharpness, called "Skrep", which at a single blow of the smiter struck straight through and cleft asunder any obstacle whatsoever; nor would aught be hard enough to check its edge when driven home. The king, loth to leave this for the benefit of posterity, and greatly grudging others the use of it, had buried it deep in the earth

— Oliver Elton translation, Gesta Danorum, Book 4

Skrep was so strong that King Wermund buried the sword rather than let someone unworthy wield it. When his son Uffo challenged two fighters (the Prince of Saxony and his chosen champion) to combat, he tried many swords, but he was so powerful that they all shattered when he first gripped their hilts and swung them. Therefore Wermund disinterred Skrep and gave it to Uffo. However, Uffo feared that Skrep would break just like the other swords, so he chose not to test it and to save it only for killing blows. During the fight, he parried blows with his shield rather than his sword, luring his enemies in until he was able to attack. He killed the Saxon champion in a single blow, with Skrep slicing through his whole frame. Using the same tactics again to lure in the prince, Uffo still feared that Skrep's sharpened blade would not withstand his strength, so he turned his sword and instead used the thicker part of the blade to slay the prince in a single blow.

After this, Uffo became king of Denmark and Saxony, and was known as Olaf the Gentle, but Saxo notes that his later deeds are not known.

== Sword of Freyr ==
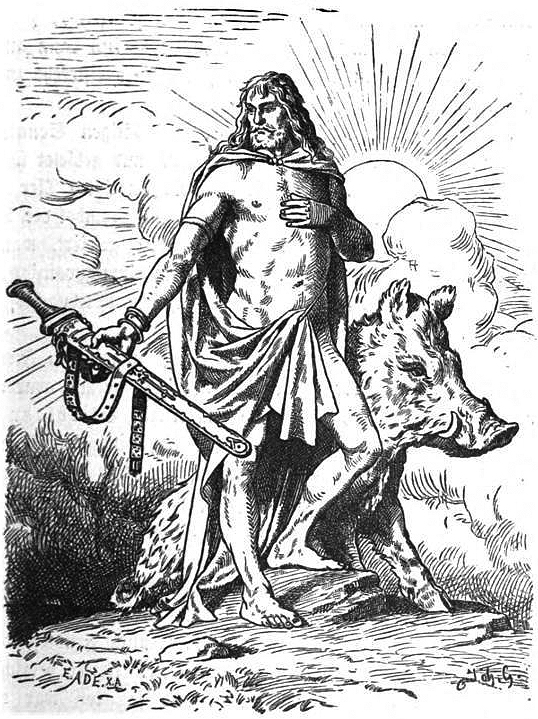
Freyr by Johannes Gehrts, shown with his sword

The Vanir Freyr has an unnamed sword that is one of the few weapons that is capable of fighting on its own.

The Prose Edda contains:

Then Freyr answered and said that he had seen a fair woman; and for her sake he was so full of grief that he would not live long if he were not to obtain her. (...) Then Skírnir answered thus: he would go on his errand, but Freyr should give him his own sword—which is so good that it fights of itself;—and Freyr did not refuse, but gave him the sword. Then Skírnir went forth and wooed the woman for him, and received her promise.

— Arthur Gilchrist Brodeur translation, Gylfaginning, Chapter 37

Freyr asks Skírnir to bring Gerðr to him, but his messenger demands his sword from him, and Freyr gives it. However, the loss of Freyr's sword has long-term consequences. According to the Prose Edda, Freyr had to fight Beli without his sword and slew him with an antler. The result at Ragnarök, the end of the world, will be much more serious. Freyr is fated to fight the fire-giant Surtr and, since he will not have his sword, he will be defeated.

In the Poetic Edda, it is said that during Ragnarok, the sun of warrior gods shines from Surtr's sword. One theory is that the sword which Surtr uses to slay Freyr is his own sword, which Freyr had earlier bargained away for Gerðr. This would add a further layer of tragedy to the myth. Sigurður Nordal argued for this view, but the possibility represented by Ursula Dronke's translation that it is a simple coincidence is equally possible. In the poem Skírnismál, the sword is given to Skírnir and used to threaten Gerðr, but not explicitly given to either the giantess or her father, much less Surtr.

Freyr's sword appears throughout Rick Riordan's fantasy novel series Magnus Chase and the Gods of Asgard as the sword "Sumarbrander" (nicknamed "Jack"), the main weapon of the titular protagonist.

== Tyrfing ==
Tyrfing, also rendered as Tirfing and Tyrving, was a magic sword that features in the Tyrfing Cycle. This includes a poem from the Poetic Edda called Hervararkviða, and the Hervarar saga. It is a powerful sword, but it was made under duress by dwarf smiths. In revenge for being forced to make the sword, they added a curse that the sword would be the cause of three great evils.

== Whitting ==
Whitting (Old Norse: Hviting) was the sword of Bersi in Chapters 9 and 10 of Kormáks saga. He used it in a holmgang against Kormak, who was wielding the sword Skofnung but had not paid attention to the instructions for using it. From Kormak's resulting bad luck, the tip of Whitting snapped off and stuck in Kormak's thumb, leading watchers to stay the fight without a victor.

== Bibliography ==
- Orchard, Andy (1997). Dictionary of Norse Myth and Legend. Cassell. pp. 129, 132. ISBN 0-304-34520-2.
- Simek, Rudolf (2007). Dictionary of Northern Mythology. Translated by Hall, Angela. D.S. Brewer. ISBN 0-85991-513-1.
