= Skírnir =

Norse mythological character

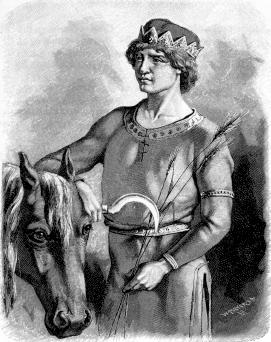
An illustration from Fredrik Sander's 1893 Swedish edition of the Poetic Edda

In Norse mythology, Skírnir (Old Norse [ˈskiːrnez̠]; "bright one") is the god Freyr's messenger and vassal. He appears in both the Poetic and Prose Eddas.

== Attestations ==
=== Poetic Edda ===
In the Eddic poem Skírnismál, Skírnir is sent as a messenger to Jötunheimr to conduct lovesick Freyr's wooing of the jötunn woman Gerðr on condition of being given Freyr's powerful sword as a reward. Skírnir begins by offering Gerðr 11 golden apples (or apples of eternal life, in a common emendation), which Gerðr rejects, adding that she and Freyr will never be together as long as they live. He next offers Gerðr a ring that produces eight more gold rings every ninth night. Gerðr responds that she is not interested in the ring for she shares her father Gymir's property, and he has no lack of gold.

Skírnir then turns to a series of threats. He first threatens to cut Gerðr's head from her neck and then threatens her father's life. He next tells Gerðr that she will sit on an eagle's mound, looking outward to the world, facing Hel, and that food will become hateful to her. He then says he will turn her into a spectacle, that she will experience madness, and become overwhelmed with unbearable desire. She will weep rather than feel joy, and she will live the rest of her life in misery with a three-headed thurs or otherwise be without a man altogether.

Skírnir tells Gerðr that he has been to a wood to get a gambanteinn, which he wields and declares that the gods Odin and Thor are angry with Gerðr, and that Freyr will hate her. He tells her that the thurs's name who will own her below the gates of Nágrind is Hrímgrímnir and that there, at the roots of the world, the finest thing Gerðr will be given to drink is goat urine. He carves a series of runes perhaps symbolizing sickness, lewdness, frenzy, and unbearable desire, and comments that if he wishes he can rub them off just as he has carved them.

Gerðr responds by telling to Skírnir to take a crystal cup containing ancient mead, noting that she thought she would never love one of the Vanir, which indicates her intention to go with him. Skírnir asks her when she will meet with Freyr. She says that they will meet at a tranquil location called Barri, and that after nine nights she will there grant Freyr her love.

Skírnir rides back to Ásgarðr. Standing outside, Freyr immediately greets Skírnir and asks for news. Skírnir tells him that Gerðr will meet him at Barri. Freyr, impatient, comments that one night is long, as is two nights, and questions how he will bear three.

=== Prose Edda ===
In the Prose Edda's Gylfaginning, Skírnir also performs favors for Oðinn, father of the gods. After the vicious wolf Fenrir evades capture, Skirnir visits the mountain dwarves, known for their mining and smithing. Together they forge the magical restraint Gleipnir for the purpose of binding the wolf. Such undertakings mark Skirnir as a crafty servant. Gylfaginning also retells the narrative of Skírnismál in prose, quoting from the poem and placing great emphasis on Freyr giving his sword to Skírnir. Later in the text, the narrator explains that Freyr's death at Ragnarök is the result of having lost his sword.

== Modern influence ==
Skírnir appears in several works of modern literature inspired by the Eddic poem Skírnismál. This includes a major part of the Danish poet Adam Gottlob Oehlenschläger's Nordens Guder (1819) as well as Icelandic poet Gerður Kristný's Blóðhófnir (2010), a feminist retelling of Skírnismál that won the 2010 Icelandic Literary Prize for fiction.

The Skirnir Mountains, a group of nunataks along the King Frederick VI Coast in the Sermersooq municipality of southeast Greenland also take their name from Skírnir.
