= Jötunheimr =

Land or lands inhabited by jötnar in Nordic Mythology

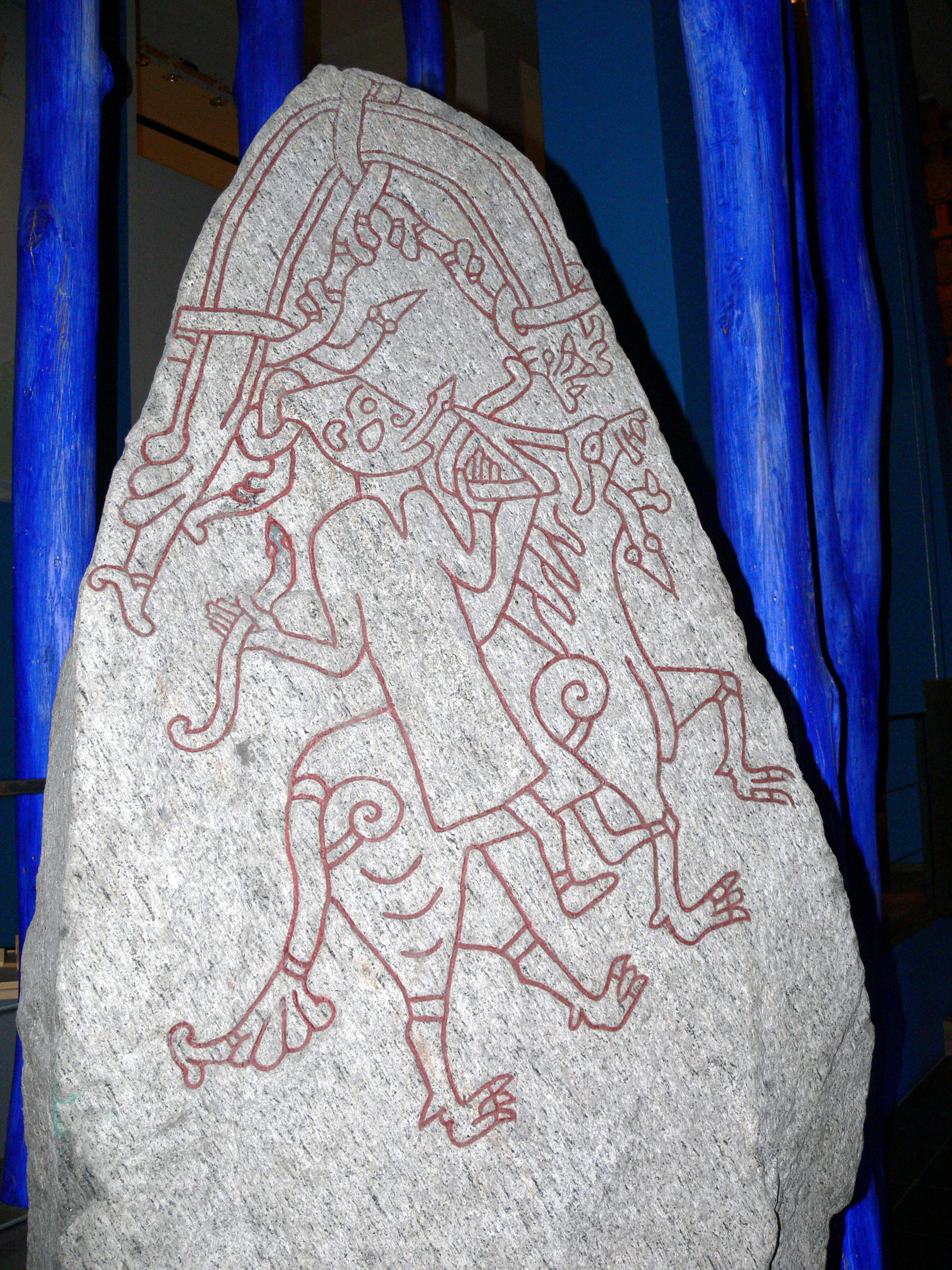
10th-century picture stone from the Hunnestad Monument that is believed to depict a female jötunn (or gýgr) riding on a wolf with vipers as reins, which has been proposed to be Hyrrokkin.

The terms Jötunheimr (in Old Norse orthography: Jǫtunheimr [ˈjɔtonˌhɛimz̠]; often anglicised as Jotunheim) or Jötunheimar refer to either a land or multiple lands respectively in Nordic mythology inhabited by the jötnar (relatives of the gods, in English sometimes inaccurately called "giants").

Jötunheimar are typically, but not exclusively, presented in Eddic sources as prosperous lands located to the north and are commonly separated from the lands inhabited by gods and humans by barriers that cannot be traversed by usual means.

== Etymology ==
Old Norse: Jǫtunheimr is a compound word formed from Old Norse: 'jǫtunn' and 'heimr', meaning a 'home' or 'world'. When attested in Eddic sources, the word is typically found in its plural form, Jǫtunheimar ('jǫtunn-lands').

== Attestations ==
=== Poetic Edda ===
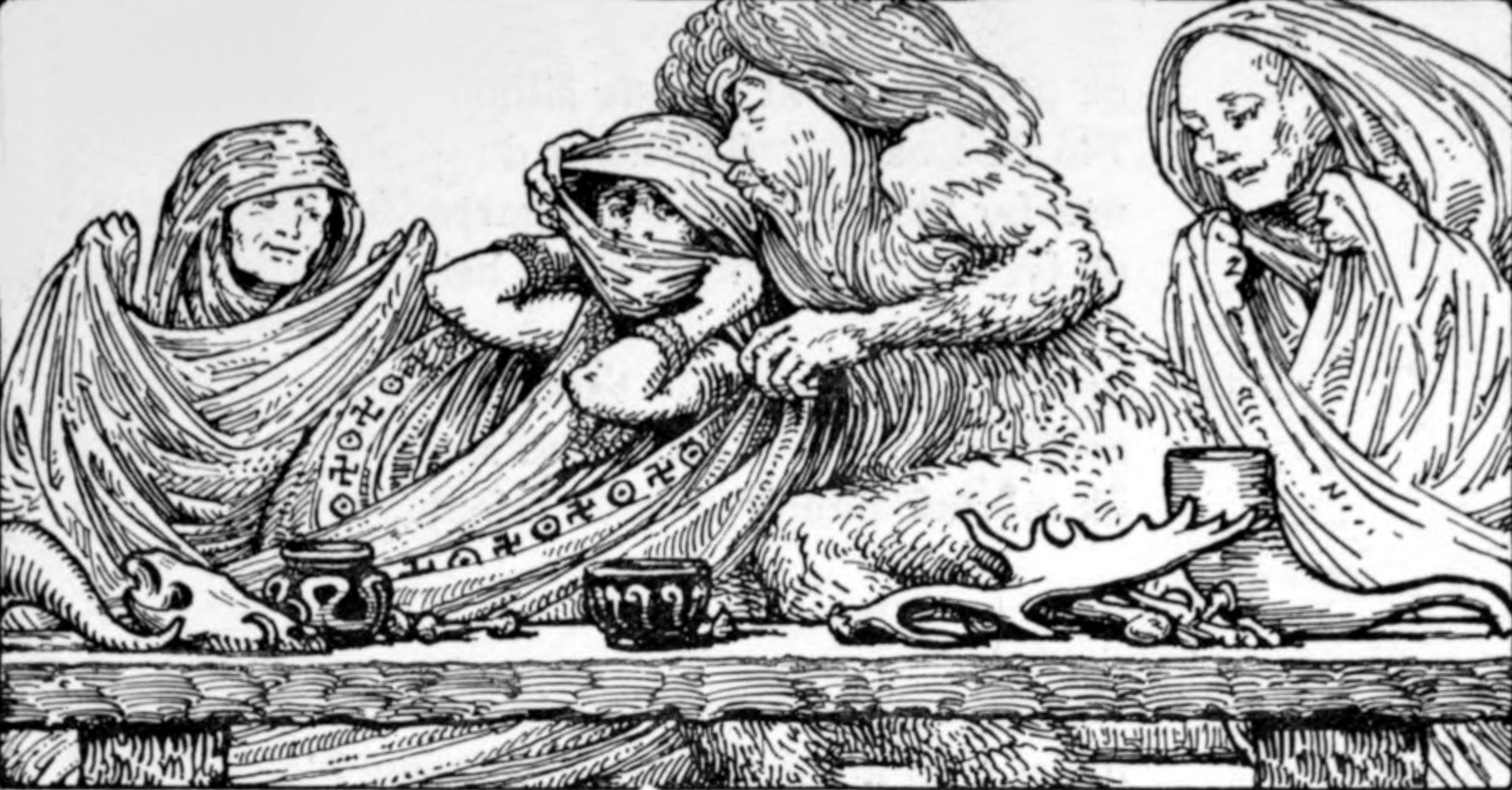
Thrym's Wedding-feast by W.G. Collingwood

Jötunheimar are mentioned in three poems of the Poetic Edda. In the beginning of Völuspá, the coming of three women out of Jötunheimar marks the end of the Age of Gold for the gods. Towards the end of the poem, in the section describing the onset of Ragnarök, they are mentioned as follows:

Old Norse text	Bellows translation
Skelfr Yggdrasils askr standandi, ymr it aldna tré, en jötunn losnar; hræðask allir á helvegum áðr Surtar þann sefi of gleypir. Hvat er með ásum? Hvat er með alfum? Gnýr allr Jötunheimr, æsir ro á þingi, stynja dvergar fyr steindurum, veggbergs vísir. Vituð ér enn - eða hvat?	Yggdrasil shakes, and shiver on high The ancient limbs, and the giant is loose; To the head of Mim does Othin give heed, But the kinsman of Surt shall slay him soon. How fare the gods? how fare the elves? All Jotunheim groans, the gods are at council; Loud roar the dwarfs by the doors of stone, The masters of the rocks: would you know yet more?

In the prose prologue Skírnismál, while sitting on Hliðskjálf, Freyr sees Gerðr, the daughter of Gymir, in Jötunheimar and falls in love with her. A further prose section then describes that he gives his servant Skírnir his horse and sends him to her home at Gymisgarðar in Jötunheimar, which he reaches after travelling through wet mountains, a flickering flame and darkness. After his journey, Skírnir meets Gerðr and her family living in a hall and tending to animals in the daylight, protected by a fence and dogs. Upon his return, Freyr asks in a stanza of the tidings from Jötunheimar, to which his servant replies that she will meet him in nine nights at Barri.

In Þrymskviða, Loki uses Freyja's fjaðrhamr to fly to Þrymr's home in jötunheimar to find Thor's hammer. The jötunn tells the god that he will only return the hammer in exchange for Freyja's hand in marriage. When she refuses to go to jötunheimar, Thor goes in her place, disguised in a wedding veil, with Loki as his handmaid. In this account, Þrymr's estate is presented as wealthy, with him holding dogs on golden leashes and telling that has cattle with golden horns in his stables and many jewels, with Freyja being the only thing he lacked.

=== Gylfaginning ===
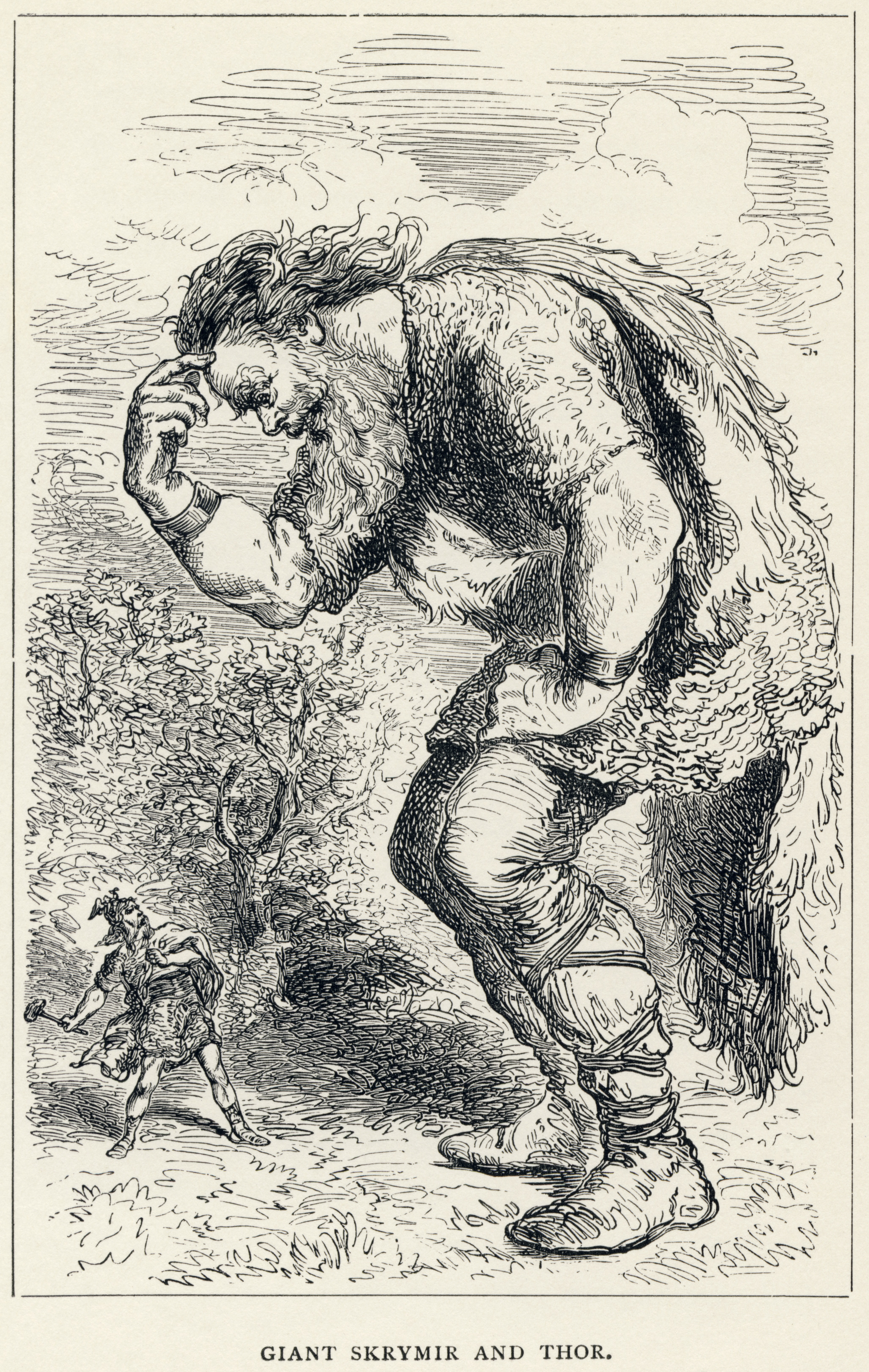
Giant Skrymir and Thor by Louis Huard

Jötunheimar are referenced throughout Gylfaginning such as when Gefjun takes four oxen, who were her sons with a jötunn, out of the jötunheimar to the north and uses them to plough land out of Sweden, forming Zealand. Jötnar and gýgjar are also described as living in jötunheimar such as the father of Night, Narfi and Angrboða, the mother of Fenrir. Beings may also come out from Jötunheimar to interact with others, such as the wright who, with the help of his horse Svaðilfari, builds fortifications for the gods to protect them from jötnar.

=== Skáldskaparmál ===
Skáldskaparmál tells of how Loki was once coerced into helping the jötunn Þjazi abduct Iðunn who carried her northwards, back to his home in Jötunheimar named Þrymheimr. Using Freyja's fjaðrhamr, Loki became a hawk and flew to Þjazi's home while the jötunn was away, having rowed out to sea. Upon reaching Iðunn, Loki turned her into a nut and flew away with her in his talons. Þjazi later finds out that Iðunn is gone and he chases after them as an eagle, but is killed as he reached Asgard when he flies into a fire that the gods made.

Later in Skáldskaparmál, Odin rides to Jötunheimar on Sleipnir where he meets the jötunn made of stone Hrungnir and wagers that no horse there was as good as his. Angered, Hrungnir chases Odin back to Asgard on his horse Gullfaxi whereupon the gods invite him to drink with them. Becoming drunk, he boasts that he will perform a number of acts including carrying Valhall to Jötunheimar and abduct both Sif and Freyja. When the gods tired of his bragging, they called for Thor. Hrungnir claimed that as he was unarmed, Thor would gain no honour from killing him and so challenged him to a fight in Jötunheimar, at his home Grjóttúnagarðar. Thor later meets him there and kills him with Mjölnir, which on its way to Hrungnir, hits the hone that the jötunn was fighting with, shattering it. One of the pieces flies into Thor's head, becoming stuck. To remove it, he went to the völva Gróa, who began a galdr to loosen it. While she was singing, Thor told her that he had carried her husband Aurvandil as he travelled southwards out of Jötunheimar and that he would soon be with her. In her excitement, she forgot the galdr and the shard remained lodged in Thor's head.

== Position in cosmology ==
Jötunheimar, along with other lands such as Hel, constitute "the otherworld" in Eddic sources that is either journeyed to or from, often leading to a confrontation that forms the basis for the narrative. There is no single location that jötunheimar are found in Nordic cosmology however, instead being travelled to by a number of different directions and often separated from the lands of humans and gods by a barrier that is difficult to cross such as bodies of water, fells, fire or forests.

Jötnar are typically found in the North and East, with explicit references to jötunheimar locating them in the North, however in Gylfaginning, Snorri Sturluson writes that after the killing of Ymir, the gods gave the shores around the world to the jötnar to settle, suggesting a worldview in which Midgard is located centrally and that the jötnar dwell in the periphery, likely in contrast with how contemporary Icelanders would have viewed wilderness. Later in Gylfaginning, Thor journeys with Loki, Thjálfi and Röskva to jötunheimar which is located to the east and over the deep sea. They then travel through a great forest before eventually reaching the hall of Útgarða-Loki. Sometimes jötnar are positioned in specific geographical locations such as Ægir on the island of Læsø.

It has been proposed that rather than being conceived of as a physical land that can be located geographically relative to the regions of the world inhabited by humans, jötunheimar should be seen as connected to other realms by a number of passageways that cannot be traversed by ordinary means, and may seem contradictory from a naturalistic viewpoint in that a single location could be reached from a start point in a number of distinct directions. In this model, the jötunheimar would not be located in these opposing directions, only the passageways by which they are reached. It has been further noted that in Eddic sources, it seems that jötnar are located to some extent in all directions and that they can be reached if one travels sufficiently far away from the area inhabited by people. From this, it has been suggested that it may be an intrinsic quality of jötnar as the "other" that they cannot be restricted to a single location, however, not all these lands inhabited by jötnar are explicitly described as being jötunheimar.

== See also ==
- List of jötnar in Norse mythology
- Otherworld

== Bibliography ==
=== Primary ===
- Bellows, Henry Adam (2004). The poetic Edda : the mythological poems. Mineola, NY: Dover Publications. ISBN 9780486437101.
- Orchard, Andy (2011). The Elder Edda : a book of Viking lore. London: Penguin Books. ISBN 9780141393728.
- Sturluson, Snorri (2018). The Prose Edda. Translated by Brodeur, Arthur Gilchrist. Franklin Classics Trade Press. ISBN 9780344335013.
- Bellows, Henry Adam. "The Poetic Edda: Voluspo". www.sacred-texts.com.
- "Gylfaginning (ON)". heimskringla.no.
- "Skáldskaparmál (ON)". heimskringla.com.
- "Skírnismál (ON)". heimskringla.com.
- "Þrymskviða (ON)". heimskringla.com.
- "Völuspá (ON)". heimskringla.com.

=== Secondary ===
- Heide, Eldar (2014). "Contradictory cosmology in Old Norse myth and religion – but still a system?". Maal og Minne (in Norwegian). 106 (1). ISSN 1890-5455.
- Jakobsson, Ármann (2006). ""Where Do the Giants Live?"". Arkiv för nordisk filologi. 121: 101–112.
- Nordvig, Mathias (2013). "A Method for Analyzing World-Models in Scandinavian Mythology". Aarhus University.
- Simek, Rudolf (2008). A Dictionary of Northern Mythology. Translated by Hall, Angela. BOYE6. ISBN 9780859915137.
- "Jǫtunheimr". Wiktionary.
- "*etunaz". Wiktionary.
- "*haimaz". Wiktionary.
