= Gerd (moon) =

Moon of Saturn

Discovery
- Discovered by: Sheppard et al.
- Discovery date: 2019

Designations
- Pronunciation: /ˈjɛərð/
- Named after: Gerðr
- Alternative names: Saturn LVII; S/2004 S 25; S8631e

Orbital characteristics
- Semi-major axis: 20544500 km
- Eccentricity: 0.457
- Orbital period (sidereal): −1095.0 days
- Inclination: 173.3°
- Satellite of: Saturn
- Group: Norse group

Physical characteristics
- Mean diameter: 4 km
- Apparent magnitude: 25.2

Gerd (Saturn LVII), provisionally known as S/2004 S 25, is a natural satellite of Saturn. Its discovery was announced by Scott S. Sheppard, David C. Jewitt, and Jan Kleyna on October 7, 2019 from observations taken between December 12, 2004 and March 22, 2007. It was given its permanent designation in August 2021. On 24 August 2022, it was officially named after Gerðr, a jötunn from Norse mythology. She is married to Freyr and is the personification of fertile soil.

Gerd is about 4 kilometres in diameter, and orbits Saturn at an average distance of 21.174 million km in 1150.69 days, at an inclination of 173° to the ecliptic, in a retrograde direction and with an eccentricity of 0.442.
