= Gerðr =

Norse deity

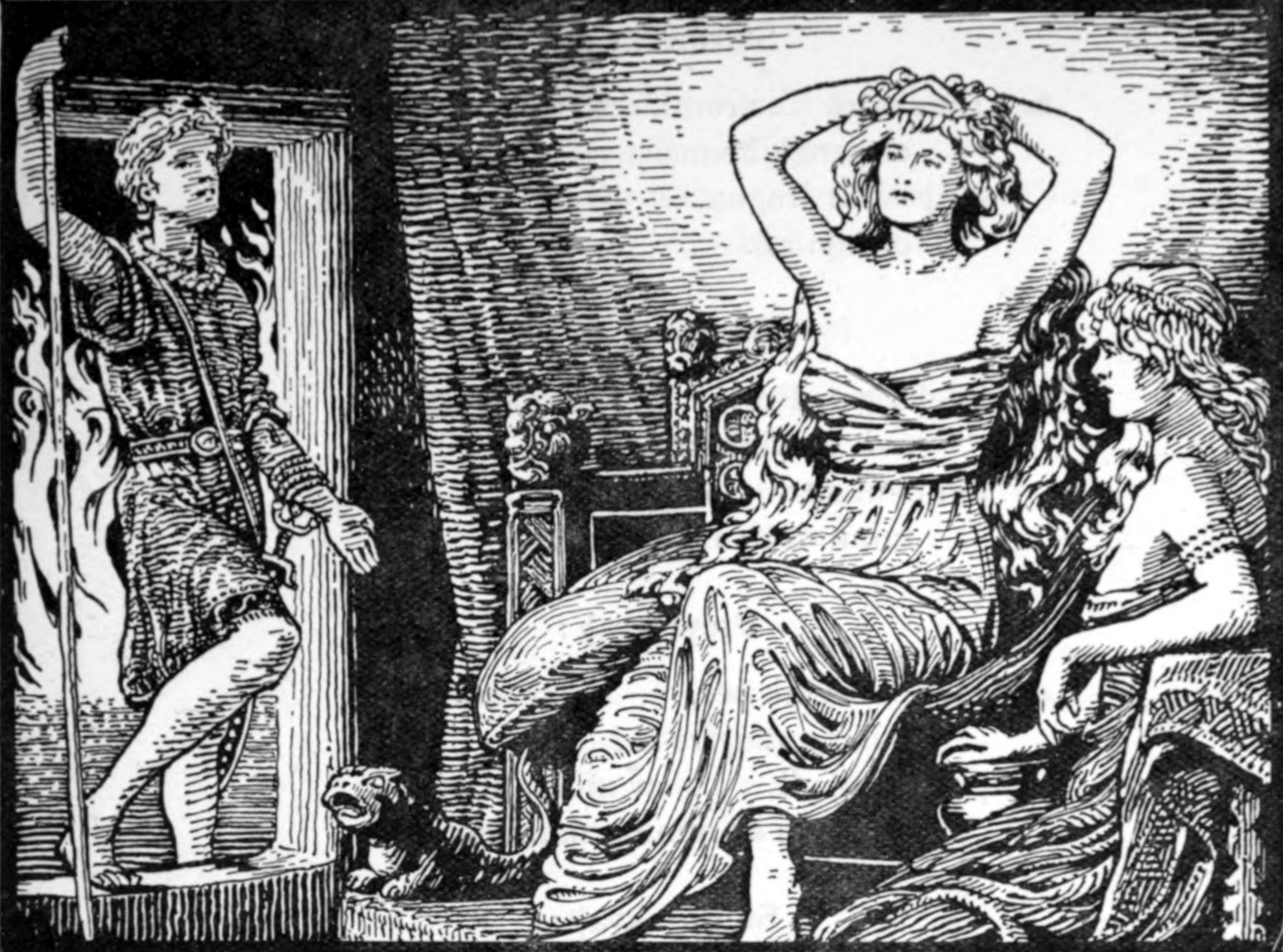
Skirnir's Message to Gerd (1908) by W. G. Collingwood.

In Norse mythology, Gerðr (Old Norse: [ˈɡerðz̠]; "fenced-in") is a jötunn, goddess, and the wife of the god Freyr. Gerðr is attested in the Poetic Edda, compiled in the 13th century from earlier traditional sources; the Prose Edda and Heimskringla, written in the 13th century by Snorri Sturluson; and in the poetry of skalds. Gerðr is sometimes modernly anglicized as Gerd or Gerth.

In both the Poetic Edda and the Prose Edda, Freyr sees Gerðr from a distance, becomes deeply lovesick at the sight of her shimmering beauty, and has his servant Skírnir go to Jötunheimr (where Gerðr and her father Gymir reside) to gain her love. In the Poetic Edda Gerðr initially refuses, yet after a series of threats by Skírnir she is forced to yield. In the Prose Edda, no mention of threats is made. In both sources, Gerðr agrees to meet Freyr at a fixed time at the location of Barri and, after Skírnir returns with Gerðr's response, Freyr laments that the meeting could not occur sooner. In both the Poetic Edda and the Prose Edda, Gerðr is described as the daughter of Gymir and the jötunn Aurboða.

In Heimskringla, Gerðr is recorded as the wife of Freyr, euhemerized as having been a beloved king of Sweden. In the same source, the couple are the founders of the Yngling dynasty and produced a son, Fjölnir, who rose to kinghood after Freyr's passing and continued their line. Gerðr is commonly theorized to be a goddess associated with the earth. Gerðr inspired works of art and literature.

== Attestations ==
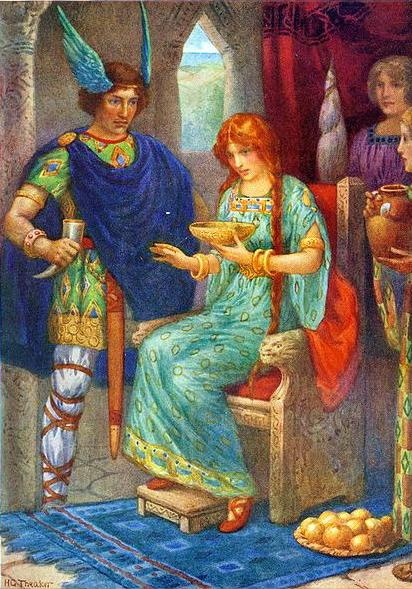
Skyrnir and Gerda - Illustration by Harry George Theaker for Children's Stories from the Northern Legends by M. Dorothy Belgrave and Hilda Hart, 1920

Gerðr is attested in two poems in the Poetic Edda, in two books of the Prose Edda, and in two books in Heimskringla.

=== Poetic Edda ===
In the Poetic Edda poem Skírnismál, the god Freyr sat on the high seat Hlidskjalf and looked into all worlds. Freyr saw a beautiful girl walking from the hall of her father to a storehouse. Freyr became heartsick for the girl. Freyr has a page named Skírnir. Freyr's father Njörðr and, in verse, the goddess Skaði tells Skírnir to find out what troubles Freyr. An exchange occurs between Freyr and Skírnir in verse, where Freyr tells Skírnir that he has seen a wondrous girl with shining arms at the home of (her father) Gymir, yet that the gods and elves do not wish for the two to be together:

| Benjamin Thorpe translation: In Gýmir's courts I saw walking a maid for whom I long. Her arms gave forth light wherewith shone all air and water. Is more desirable to me that maid than to any youth in early days; yet will no one, Æsir or Alfar, that we together live. | Henry Adams Bellows translation: "From Gymir's house I behold forth A maiden dear to me; Her arms glittered, and from their gleam Shone all the sea and sky." "To me more dear than in days of old Was ever maiden to man; But no one of gods or elves will grant That we be together should be." |

Skírnir requests that Freyr give him a horse and Freyr's sword; a sword which fights jötnar by itself. Under the cover of darkness, Skírnir rides the horse over nations and dew-covered mountains until he reaches Jötunheimr, the home of the jötnar, and proceeds to Gymir's courts. Ferocious dogs are tied before the wooden fence that surrounds Gerðr's hall. Skírnir rides out to a herdsman (unnamed) sitting on a mound, greets him, and asks the herdsman how he may speak to the maiden beyond Gymir's dogs. An exchange occurs between the herdsman and Skírnir, during which the herdsman tells Skírnir that he will never speak to the girl.

Hearing a terrible noise in her dwellings, Gerðr asks where it is coming from, noting that the earth trembles and that all of Gymir's courts shake. A serving maid (unnamed) notes that outside a man has dismounted his horse and has let it graze. Gerðr tells the serving maid to invite the man to come into their hall and to partake of some of their "famous mead," yet Gerðr expresses fear that the man outside may be her "brother's slayer".

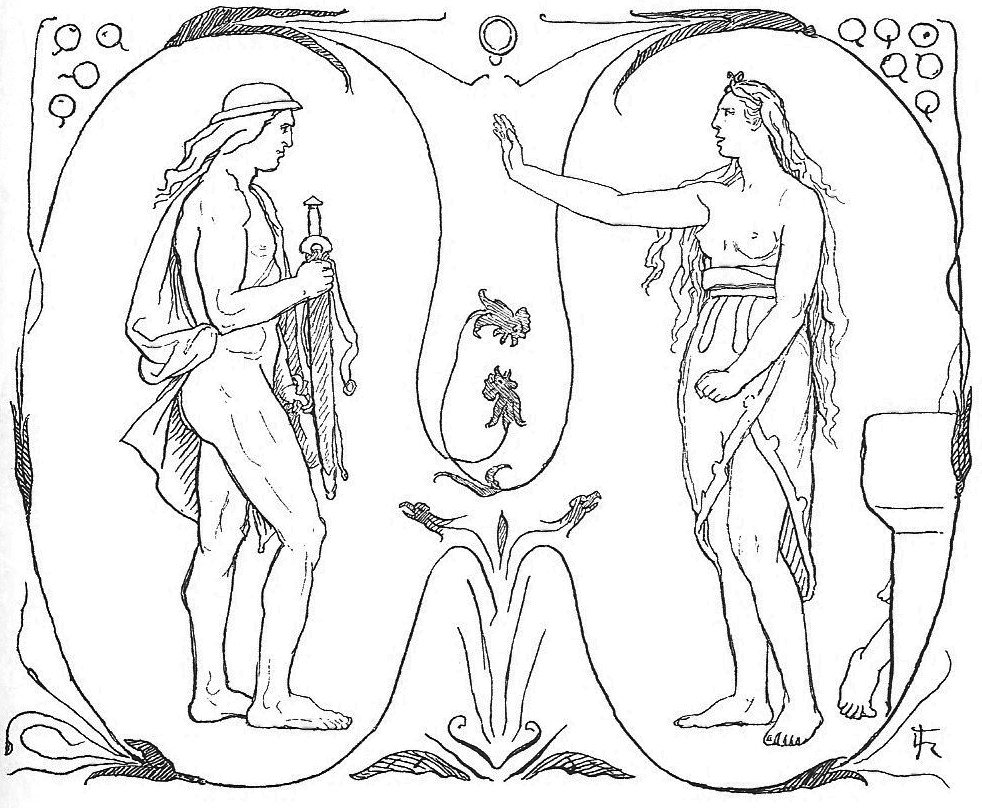
Gerðr refuses Skírnir's offer of eleven golden apples and the ring gift as illustrated (1895) by Lorenz Frølich.

Gerðr asks the stranger if he is of the elves, Æsir, or the Vanir, and why he comes alone "over the wild fire" to seek their company. Skírnir responds that he is of none of these groups, yet that he has indeed sought her out. Skírnir offers Gerðr 11 golden apples (or apples of eternal life, in a common emendation) to gain her favor. Gerðr rejects the apples—no matter who offers them—and adds that neither will she and Freyr be together as long as they live. Skírnir offers Gerðr a ring, here unnamed (Draupnir), that produces eight more gold rings every ninth night and "was burned with Odin's young son". Gerðr responds that she is not interested in the ring, for she shares her father's property, and Gymir has no lack of gold.

==== Threats ====
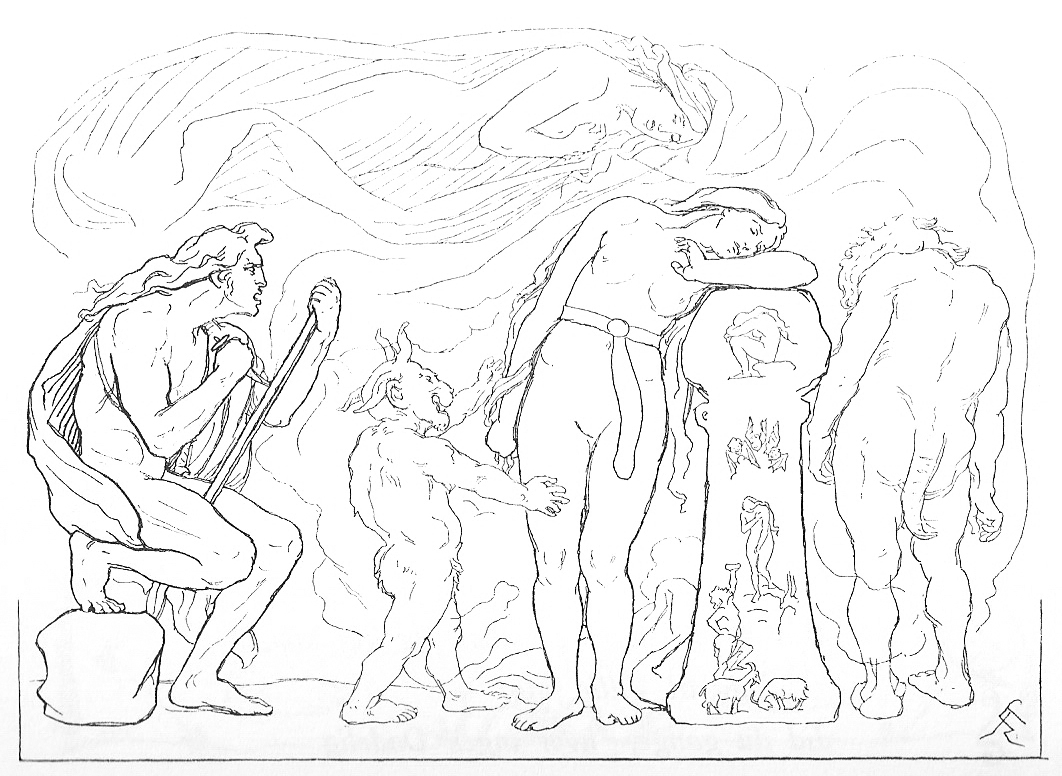
Skírnir has turned to threats, describing Gerðr's fate at her refusal, as illustrated (1895) by Lorenz Frølich.

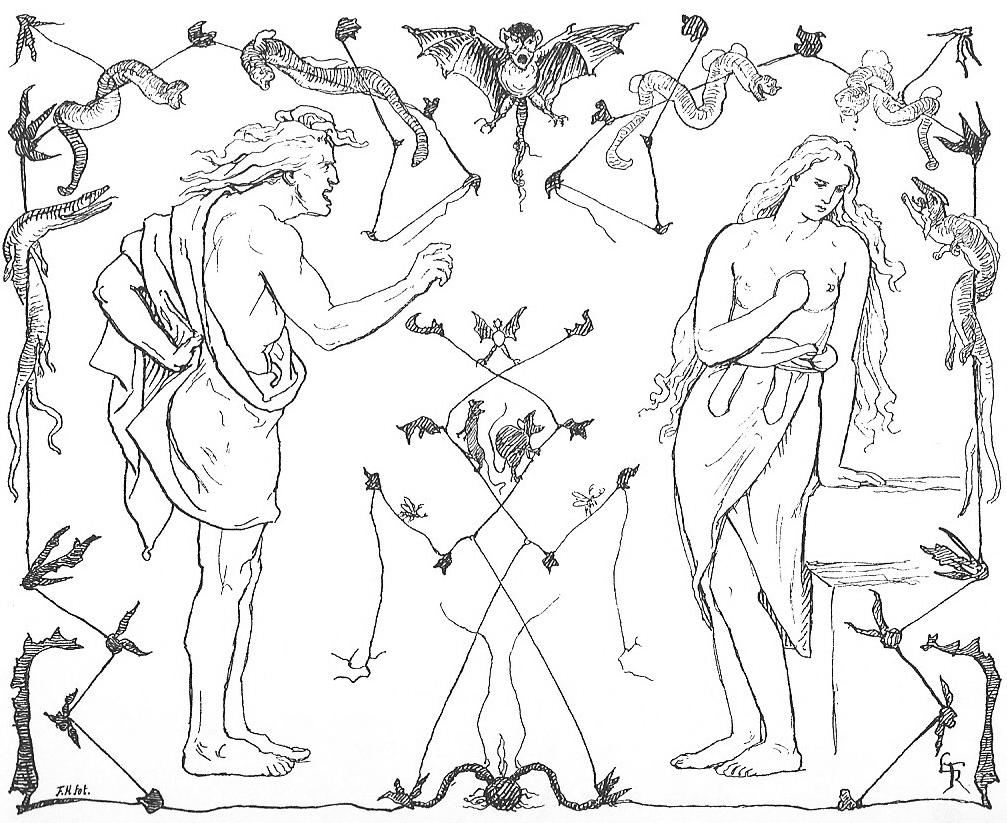
Skírnir continues his threats as illustrated (1895) by Lorenz Frølich.

Skírnir turns to threats; he points out to Gerðr that he holds a sword in his hand and he threatens to cut her head from her neck unless she agrees. Gerðr refuses; she says that she will not endure the coercion of any man, and says that if Gymir encounters Skírnir then a battle can be expected. Skírnir again reminds Gerðr of his blade and predicts that Gerðr's jötunn father will meet his doom with it. Skírnir warns Gerðr that he will strike her with his Gambanteinn, a wand, that it will tame her to his desires, and says that she will never again be seen by "the sons of men". From early morning, Gerðr will sit on an eagle's mound, looking outward to the world, facing Hel, and that "food shall be more hateful to you than to every man is the shining serpent among men".

Skírnir declares that when Gerðr comes out she will be a spectacle; Hrímgrímnir will "glare" at her, "everything" will stare at her, she will become more famous than the watchman of the gods, and that she will "gape through the bars". Gerðr will experience "madness and howling, tearing affliction and unbearable desire" and that, in grief, tears will flow from her. Skírnir tells Gerðr to sit down, for her fate will be even worse yet. She will be harassed by fiends all her weary days. From the court of jötnar to the halls of the hrimthurs, Gerðr shall everyday crawl without choice, nor hope of choice. Gerðr will weep rather than feel joy, suffering tearfully. She will live the rest of her life in misery with a three-headed thurs or otherwise be without a man altogether. Skírnir commands for Gerðr's mind to be seized, that she may waste away with pining, and that she be as the thistle at the end of the harvest; crushed.

Skírnir says that he has been to a wood to get a "potent branch", which he found. He declares that the gods Odin and Thor are angry with Gerðr, and that Freyr will hate her; she has "brought down the potent wrath of the gods". Skírnir declares to the hrimthursar, thursar, the sons of Suttungr, and the "troops of the Æsir" that he has denied both pleasure and benefit from men to Gerðr. Skírnir details that the thurs's name who will own her below the gates of Nágrind is Hrímgrímnir and that there, at the roots of the world, the finest thing Gerðr will be given to drink is the urine of goats. He carves "thurs" (the runic character *thurisaz) on Gerðr and three runes (unnamed) symbolizing lewdness, frenzy, and unbearable desire, and comments that he can rub them off just as he has carved them—if he wishes.

Gerðr responds with a welcome to Skírnir and tells him to take a crystal cup containing ancient mead, noting that she thought she would never love one of the Vanir. Skírnir asks her when she will meet with Freyr. Gerðr says that they shall meet at a tranquil location called Barri, and that after nine nights she will there grant Freyr her love:

| Benjamin Thorpe translation: Barri is the grove named, which we both know, the grove of tranquil paths. Nine nights hence, there to Niörd's son Gerd will grant delight. | Henry Adams Bellows translation: Barri there is, which we both know well,. A forest fair and still; And nine nights hence to the son of Njorth Will Gerth grant delight. |

Skírnir rides home. Standing outside, Freyr immediately greets Skírnir and asks for news. Skírnir tells him that Gerðr says she will meet with him at Barri. Freyr, impatient, comments that one night is long, as is two nights, and questions how he will bear three, noting that frequently a month seemed shorter than half a night before being with Gerðr.

A stanza in the poem Lokasenna refers to Gerðr. In the poem, Loki accuses the god Freyr of having purchased Gymir's daughter (Gerðr) with gold and comments that, in the process, Freyr gave away his sword. Referring to Freyr as a "wretch", Loki then posits how Freyr intends to fight when the Sons of Muspell ride over the wood Myrkviðr (an event during Ragnarök). Freyr's servant, Byggvir, interjects and the poem continues.

In the poem Hyndluljóð, Óttar's ancestry is recounted and information is provided about the gods. One stanza that actually belongs to Völuspá hin skamma relates that Freyr and Gerðr were married, that Gerðr is the daughter of the jötunn Gymir, that Gerðr's mother is Aurboða, and that they are related to Þjazi (the nature of the kinship is not specified)—father of the goddess and jötunn Skaði.

=== Prose Edda ===
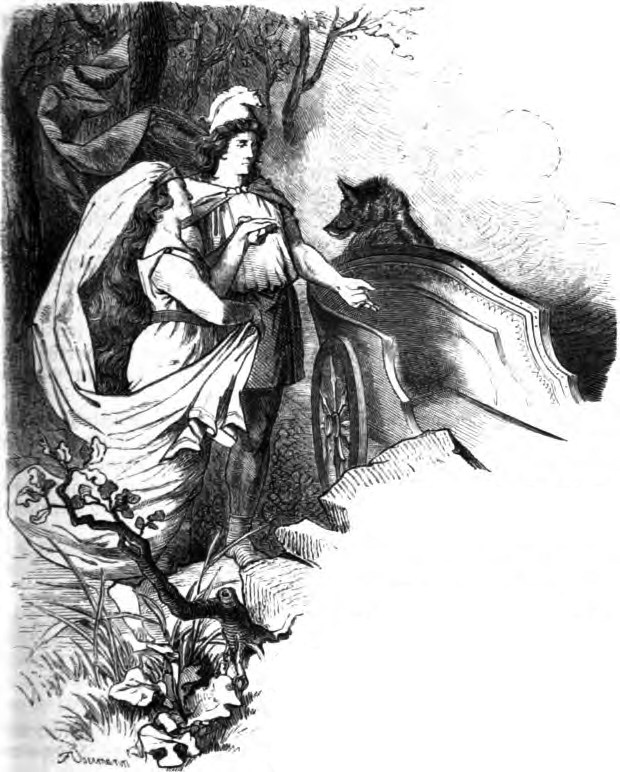
Skírnir Persuades Gerðr to Follow Him (1882) by Karl Ehrenberg.

In chapter 37 of the Prose Edda book Gylfaginning, Gerðr is introduced by the enthroned figure of High as the daughter of Gymir and the mountain jötunn Aurboða, and is described as "the most beautiful of all women". High reports that Freyr went into Hlidskjalf and looked over all worlds. When Freyr looked to the north he saw a distant homestead with a large and magnificent building. A woman went to the building, and when she lifted her arms and opened the door to the building "light was shed from her arms over both sky and sea, and all worlds were made bright by her". In punishment for "his great presumption" in having sat in the holy seat, Freyr went away filled with grief.

Freyr arrives home and neither sleeps nor drinks, remaining in silence. No one dares speak to him. The god Njörðr sends Freyr's servant Skírnir to speak to Freyr. Freyr tells Skírnir that he saw a beautiful woman, so beautiful that he was filled with grief and that he would soon die if he could not have her. Freyr tells Skírnir that he must go gain her hand on his behalf—whether the woman's father agrees or not—and he will be rewarded. Skírnir replies that he accepts the mission but only in exchange for Freyr's sword, which can fight on its own. Freyr gives him the sword and Skírnir sets off. Skírnir asks for the woman's hand for Freyr and receives her promise. Nine nights later she is to meet with Freyr at a location called Barey. Skírnir delivers the news to Freyr and Freyr responds with the final stanza from the Poetic Edda poem Skírnismál, lamenting that he must wait.

At the beginning of the Prose Edda book Skáldskaparmál, eight goddesses are listed as attending a feast held by Ægir on the island of Hlesey (now Læsø, Denmark), including Gerðr. In chapter 19, different ways of referring to the goddess Frigg are provided. One of these names is "rival of Gerðr"; however, this is probably a scribal error (see "Theories" section below). In chapter 57, various goddesses are listed, including Gerðr (between Snotra and Gefjon).

=== Heimskringla ===
In chapter 12 of Ynglinga saga (as collected in Heimskringla), a euhemerized prose account relates that Freyr was a much loved king in what is now Sweden. Freyr's wife was Gerðr and their son was Fjölnir. Gerðr's fate is not provided, but after Freyr's death their son goes on to become king and their family line, the Ynglings, continues. In a verse stanza found in chapter 16 of Haralds saga Gráfeldar, Gerðr is mentioned in a kenning for "woman" ("Gerðr-of-gold-rings").

== Archaeological record ==
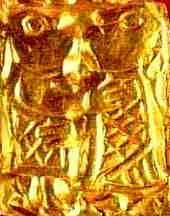
Two figures embrace on a small piece of gold foil dating from the Migration Period to the early the Viking Age.

Small pieces of gold foil featuring engravings dating from the Migration Period into the early Viking Age (known as gullgubber) have been discovered in various locations in Scandinavia, almost 2,500 at one location. The foil pieces have been found largely at sites of buildings, only rarely in graves. The figures are sometimes single, occasionally an animal, sometimes a man and a woman with a leafy bough between them, facing or embracing one another. The human figures are almost always clothed and are sometimes depicted with their knees bent. Scholar Hilda Ellis Davidson says that it has been suggested that the figures are partaking in a dance, and that they may have been connected with weddings, as well as linked to the Vanir group of gods, representing the notion of a divine marriage, such as in the Poetic Edda poem Skírnismál; the coming together of Gerðr and Freyr.

== Theories ==
=== "Rival of Frigg" ===
In chapter 19 of the Prose Edda book Skáldskaparmál, Gerðr is listed among "rivals" of the goddess Frigg, a list of sexual partners of Frigg's husband, Odin. Instead of Gerðr, the jötunn Gríðr, mother of Odin's son Víðarr according to the Prose Edda, was probably intended. One manuscript has Gríðr corrected to Gerðr. Andy Orchard notes that it may nonetheless be an intentional inclusion in view of "Odin's notorious appetites".

=== Earth and fertility ===
Scholar John Lindow comments that Gerðr's name has been etymologically associated with the earth and enclosures and that the wedding of Gerðr and Freyr is commonly seen as "the divine coupling of sky and earth or at least fertility god and representative of the soil." Lindow adds that, at the same time, the situation can be read as simply the gods getting what they want from the jötnar.

Hilda Ellis Davidson comments that Gerðr's role in Skírnismál has parallels with the goddess Persephone from Greek mythology, "since it is made clear that if [Gerðr] remains below in the dark kingdom of the underworld there will be nothing to hope for but sterility and famine. She does not become the bride of the underworld, however; her bridal is to be in the upper world when she consents to meet Freyr at Barri."

== Modern influence ==
Gerðr has inspired works of art and literature. The Danish poet Adam Gottlob Oehlenschläger wrote a series of poems referencing Gerðr as collected in (1819) Nordens Guder. Esaias Tegnér's (1782–1846) unfinished epic poem Gerda also references the goddess. K. Ehrenberg depicted the goddess in his illustration (1883) Freyr und Gerda, Skade und Niurd. Her story was retold in free verse by the Icelandic poet Gerður Kristný in her Blóðhófnir, a feminist retelling of Skírnismál that won the 2010 Icelandic Literature Award.

Saturn's moon Gerd is named after her.

Gerd is also the name of a giantess doctor in the manga and anime One Piece.
