= Gambanteinn =

Magic wand in Norse mythology

Gambanteinn is an Old Norse term referring to a magic staff or wand. It is attested in two poems in the Poetic Edda: Hárbarðsljóð and Skírnismál.

== Etymology ==
The word is a compound of the prefix Old Norse: gamban- with the noun teinn. The latter essentially means "rod, twig" and thereof, but the prefix is dubious. In Old Norse, it is used as an indicator of magnitude, or potentially magical potency or divine power. Compounds include: gambanreiði ("great wrath") and gambansumbl ("great banquet"). It could potentially be a calque from Old English: gomban/gombon, which is attested twice in Old English, the first instance, in the phrase gomban gyldan ("to pay tribute"), at the start of Beowulf, the second instance, in the same phrase gombon gieldan, found in the Old English Biblical poem Genesis A. Further theories exist on its poetic and root meaning.

== Hárbarðsljóð ==
In Hárbarðsljóð stanza 20, Hárbarðr says:

A giant hard was Hlébard, methinks:
His gambanteinn he gave me as gift,
And I stole his wits away.

== Skírnismál ==
In Skírnismál (Stanzas 25 to 26) Skírnir speaks to Gerd:

Seest thou, maiden, this keen, bright sword

That I hold here in my hand?
Before its blade the old giant bends,—
Thy father is doomed to die.

I strike thee, maid, with my gambanteinn,
To tame thee to work my will;
There shalt thou go where never again

The sons of men shall see thee.

Skírnir then condemns Gerd to live lonely and hideous, unloved, either married to a three-headed giant or forever unwed. It might seem that this gambanteinn also refers to the sword with which Skirnir has previously threatened Gerd. But immediately after concluding his curse, Skírnir says (stanza 32):

I go to the wood, and to the wet forest,
To win a gambanteinn;
. . . . . . . . .
I won a gambanteinn.

The poem then continues with further threats by Skírnir condemning Gerd to a life of misery.
