= Beyla =

One of Freyr's servants in Norse mythology

Beyla (Old Norse: [ˈbœylɑ]) is one of Freyr's servants along with her husband, Byggvir, in Norse mythology. Beyla is mentioned in stanzas 55, 66, and the prose introduction to the Poetic Edda poem Lokasenna. Since this is the only mention of Beyla, scholars have turned to the etymology of Beyla's name for additional information about her. However, the meaning of her name is unclear and her name has been proposed as related to "cow," "bean," or "bee."

== Lokasenna ==
In the prose introduction to Lokasenna, Beyla and Byggvir are cited as attending In stanza 55 of Lokasenna, after his verses with Sif, Loki accuses Beyla of being filthy but the reason for this is unclear.

Stanza 55:

Beyla qvaþ: «Fioll a/ll scialfa, hygg ec a for vera heiman Hlorriþa; hann reþr ró þeim er rogir her goð a/ll oc gvma.»	Beyla spake: "The mountains shake, and surely I think From his home comes Hlorrithi now; He will silence the man who is slandering here Together both gods and men."

Stanza 56:

Loci qvaþ: «Þegi þv, Beyla! þv ert Byggviss qven oc meini blandin mioc; okynian meira coma meþ asa sonom, a/ll ertv, deigia! dritin.»	Loki spake: "Be silent, Beyla! thou art Byggvir's wife, And deep art thou steeped in sin; A greater shame to the gods came ne'er, Befouled thou art with thy filth."

In relation to Loki's comments in Lokasenna, proposals have been made that Beyla and her husband are personifications of agriculture associated with Freyr: Beyla as the manure that softens the earth and develops the seed, Byggvir as the refuse of the mill, chaff.
