= Byggvir =

Figure in norse mythology

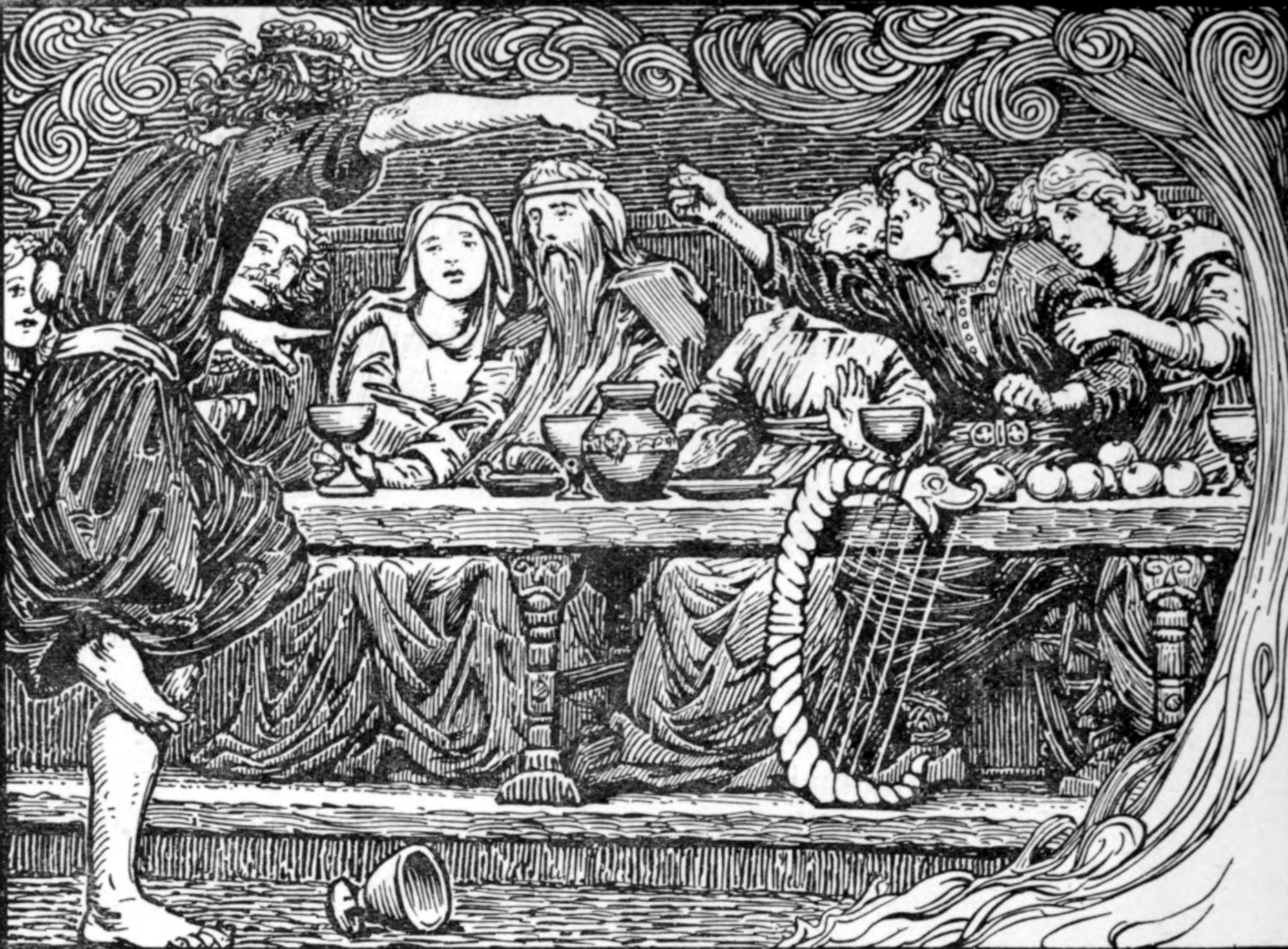

Byggvir is a figure in Norse mythology. The only surviving mention of Byggvir appears in the prose beginning of Lokasenna, and stanzas 55 through 56 of the same poem, where he is referred to as one of Freyr's servants and as the husband of Beyla.

Bygg is the Old Norse word for barley. Subsequently, Byggvir [ˈbyɡːvir] is often identified with this etymology of his name and connections have been placed with the mentioning of Byggvir's described involvement with mill-grinding as being potential references to barley processing. Comparisons to the Anglo-Saxon figure of Beowa (Old English "barley") have been put forth.

== Lokasenna ==
In Lokasenna, Loki is depicted as degrading Byggvir for being of slight stature and as a gossiper:

Stanza 43:

Byggvir qvaþ: «Veiztv, ef ec øþli ettac sem Ingvnar-Freyr oc sva selict setr, mergi smera ma/lþa ec þa meíncráco oc lemþa alla i liþo.»	Byggvir spake: Had I birth so famous as Ingunar-Freyr, And sat in so lofty a seat, I would crush to marrow this croaker of ill, And beat all his body to bits."

Stanza 44:

Loci qvaþ: «Hvat er þat iþ litla, er ec þat la/ggra sec oc snapvist snapir; at eyrom Freys mvnðv e vera oc vnd kvernom klaca.»	Loki spake: "What little creature goes crawling there, Snuffling and snapping about? At Freyr's ears ever wilt thou be found, Or muttering hard at the mill."

Stanza 45:

Beyggvir qvaþ: «Beyggvir ec heíti, enn mic braþan qveþa goð a/ll oc gvmar: þvi em ec her hroðvgr, at drecca Hroptz megir allir a/l saman.»	Byggvir spake: "Byggvir my name, and nimble am I, As gods and men do grant; And here am I proud that the children of Hropt Together all drink ale."

Stanza 46:

Loci qvaþ: «Þegi þv, Byggvir! þv kvnnir aldregi deila meþ monnom mat; oc þic i fletz strá finna ne mattv, þa er vago verar.»	Loki spake: "Be silent, Byggvir! thou never couldst set Their shares of the meat for men; Hid in straw on the floor, they found thee not When heroes were fain to fight."

== Interpretation ==
In relation to Loki's comments in Lokasenna, proposals have been made that Beyla and her husband are personifications of agriculture associated with Freyr: Beyla as the manure that softens the earth and develops the seed, Byggvir as the refuse of the mill, chaff.

== See also ==
- John Barleycorn
- Corn dolly
- Sif
