= Barri =

Place in Norse mythology

In Norse mythology, Barri is the place where Freyr and Gerðr are to consummate their union, as stated in the Skírnismál:

Barri the grove is named,
which we both know,
the grove of tranquil paths.
Nine nights hence,
there to Niörd’s son
Gerd will grant delight.

—För Skirnis eðr Skirnismál (39), Thorpe's translation

In Snorri Sturluson's account of the myth (found in Gylfaginning, 37), the place is called Barrey or Barey:

And nine nights later she was to come to the place called Barrey, and then go to the bridal with Freyr.

—Gylfaginning (37), Brodeur's translation

The meaning of the name is uncertain. Barri is called a grove (lundr) but Bar(r)ey is probably an island (ey being the Old Norse for "island") and could be connected with Barra, one of the Hebrides islands, which was once called Barrey. The meaning of the first part of the name, barr, is not very enlightening for it has several meanings: "pine needle", "conifer", "tree" or "grain", especially "barley". Magnus Olsen suggested that Barri meant "cornfield". This supports his interpretation of the union of Freyr and Gerðr as a holy wedding between a fertility god and the Earth Mother. But this interpretation has been contested and Barri could be rendered into "coniferous forest" (as Rudolf Simek noticed, it would be a suitable name for a grove) and the signification of Barrey might be "barley-island" or "grain-island", which, John Lindow underlined, "makes no sense in the context of a fertility myth".
