= Freyr =

Norse deity

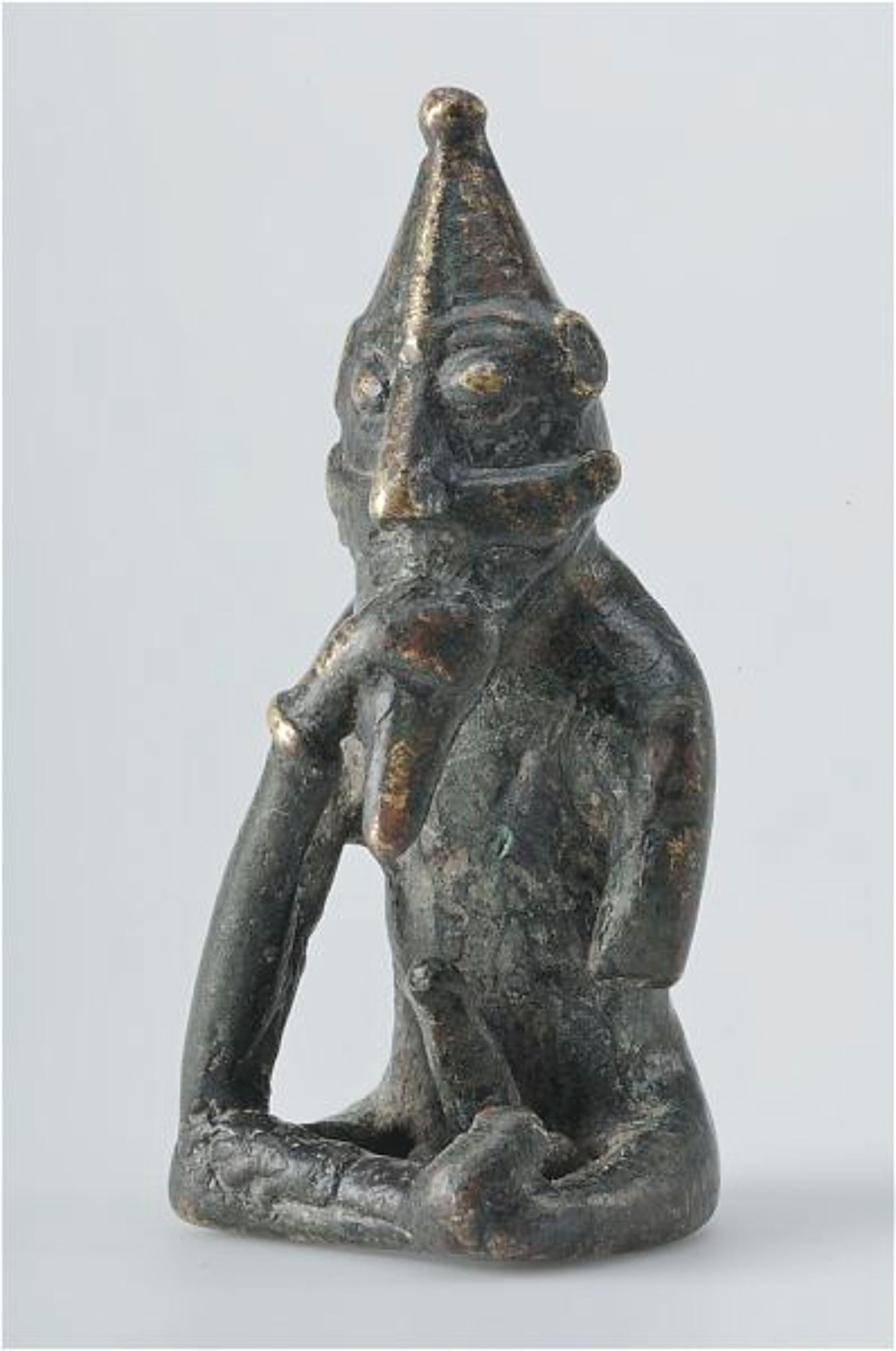
The Rällinge statuette from Södermanland, Sweden, believed to depict Freyr, Viking Age

In Norse mythology, Freyr (cf. Old Swedish: Frø; Old Norse for "Lord, Master", or "The Fruitful") is a god associated with kingship, peace, fertility, prosperity, fair weather, and good harvest. Freyr, sometimes referred to as Yngvi-Freyr, was especially associated with Sweden and seen as an ancestor of the Swedish royal house. According to Adam of Bremen, Freyr was associated with peace and pleasure, and was represented with a phallic statue in the Temple at Uppsala. According to Snorri Sturluson, Freyr was "the most renowned of the Æsir", and was venerated for good harvest and peace.

In the mythological stories in the Icelandic books the Poetic Edda and the Prose Edda, Freyr, one of the Vanir, is the son of the god Njörðr and his unnamed twin sister, and the twin brother of the goddess Freyja. The gods gave him Álfheimr, the realm of the Elves, as a teething present. He rides the shining dwarf-made boar Gullinbursti, and possesses the ship Skíðblaðnir, which always has a favorable breeze and can be folded together and carried in a pouch when it is not being used. Freyr is also known to have been associated with the horse cult. He also kept sacred horses in his sanctuary at Trondheim in Norway. He has three servants: Skírnir, Byggvir and Beyla.

The most extensive surviving Freyr myth relates Freyr's falling in love with the female jötunn Gerðr. Eventually, she becomes his wife but first Freyr has to give away his sword, which fights on its own "if wise be he who wields it." Although deprived of this weapon, Freyr defeats the jötunn Beli with an antler. However, lacking his sword, Freyr will be killed by the fire jötunn Surtr during the events of Ragnarök.

Like other Germanic deities, veneration of Freyr was revived during the modern period through the Heathenry movement.

== Etymology ==
The Old Norse name Freyr ('lord') is generally thought to descend from a Proto-Norse form reconstructed as *frawjaʀ/*fraujaʀ, stemming from the Proto-Germanic noun *frawjaz ~ *fraw(j)ōn ('lord'), and cognate with Gothic frauja, Old English frēa, or Old High German frō, all meaning 'lord, master'.

The runic form frohila, derived from an earlier *frōjila, may also be related.

Another suggested etymology derives the name of the god from a nominalized form (*freyr) of the Proto-Norse adjective *fraiw(i)a- (Swedish: frö, 'fruitful, fertile, generative'), i.e. "the fruitful one". According to linguist Guus Kroonen, "within Germanic, the attestation of ON frjar, frjór, frær, Icel. frjór adj. 'fertile; prolific' < *fraiwa- clearly seems to point to a stem *frai(w)- meaning 'fecund'. Both in form and meaning, fraiwa- ('seed') is reminiscent of Freyr 'fertility deity' < *frauja-. The possibility must be considered, therefore, that *fraiwa- was metathesized from *frawja-, a collective of some kind."

The above is supported by Swedish tradition. In Sweden, Freyr's name was Frö (Old Swedish: Frø), subsequently mirroring the word for 'seed, semen, offspring' – Swedish: frö, Old Swedish: frǿ; cf. Old Norse: frjó, fræ, Middle English: fry (English: fry), Gothic: 𐍆𐍂𐌰𐌹𐍅 (fraiw). He was important to Swedish farmers, and was associated with prosperity, expecially the concept of fruktår ("fruitful year"), a year of good yield and abundant harvest, which is mirrored in the Swedish rune poems, as the rune ᚠ (/f/) sometimes carried his name Frö (Fröj, Frägh, Fre; also Frigg, another fertility deity):

Poem	Translation
ᚠ – Fäklä f͡ränd-ro (ᚠᛅᚴᛚᛅ ᚠᚱᛅᚿᛑ_ᚱᚭ)	ᚠ – Prosperity for birds and kin alike (Note: Based on the Latin translation given by Olaus Rudbeck: Avibus eque ac consangvineis pax.)
ᚠ – Fugle Frende Roo	ᚠ – Prosperity for birds and kin alike
ᚠ – Fuglefrände roo Frid all roo i.e. Frucht åhr	ᚠ – Prosperity for birds and kin alike Free prosperity to all i.e. Fruitful year (good yield and abundant harvest)
ᚠ – Fä frände ro	ᚠ – Prosperity for livestock and kin alike
Fro Fride Roo	Frey's free and fruitful prosperity (Note: Based on the Latin translation given by Olaus Rudbeck: Saturni libera pax.)
Fro Frede Roo	Frey's free and fruitful prosperity
Frej Frode Ruu	Frey's free and fruitful prosperity
Fros Frede Fast	Frey's assured prosperity (Note: Based on the Latin translation given by Olaus Rudbeck: Saturni pax tutissima.)
Fros Fre Frände Fragur	Frey's wealth is the prosperity and abundance of his kin (Note: Based on the Latin translation given by Olaus Rudbeck: Saturni opes amicorum celebritas.)
Frej Frode Ru ett gåt år gifwer, Säll är then som tå lefwer, Gott är tå gästa Wänner och Fränder, ty tå gifz fult up åt alla i sender.	Frey grants a prosperous year; blessed is he who lives to see it. Then it is good to visit friends and kin, for there will be plenty for everyone. (Note: Based on the Latin translation given by Olaus Rudbeck: free frode ruu, felix auspicatusque erit. Beatis merito accensendus, cui tunc vivere contingit, Bonum & jucundum erit, apud amicos consangvineosque hospitare, cunctis enim abunde erit.)

Freyr is also known by a series of other names which describe his attributes and role in religious practice and associated mythology.

== Adam of Bremen ==
Written c. 1080, one of the oldest written sources on pre-Christian Scandinavian religious practices is Adam of Bremen's Gesta Hammaburgensis ecclesiae pontificum. Adam claimed to have access to first-hand accounts on pagan practices in Sweden. He refers to Freyr with the Latinized name Fricco (= Frigg) and mentions that an image of him at Skara was destroyed by the Christian missionary Bishop Egino. Adam's description of the Temple at Uppsala gives some details on the god.

In hoc templo, quod totum ex auro paratum est, statuas atrium deorum veneratur populus, ita ut potentissimus eorum Thor in medio solium habeat triclinio; hinc et inde locum possident Wodan et Fricco. Quorum significationes eiusmodi sunt: 'Thor', inquiunt, 'praesidet in aere, qui tonitrus et fulmina, ventos ymbresque, serena et fruges gubernat. Alter Wodan, id est furor, bella gerit, hominique ministrat virtutem contra inimicos. Tertius est Fricco, pacem voluptatem que largiens mortalibus'. Cuius etiam simulacrum fingunt cum ingenti priapo.

Gesta Hammaburgensis 26, Waitz' edition

In this temple, entirely decked out in gold, the people worship the statues of three gods in such wise that the mightiest of them, Thor, occupies a throne in the middle of the chamber; Woden and Frikko have places on either side. The significance of these gods is as follows: Thor, they say, presides over the air, which governs the thunder and lightning, the winds and rains, fair weather and crops. The other, Woden—that is, the Furious—carries on war and imparts to man strength against his enemies. The third is Frikko, who bestows peace and pleasure on mortals. His likeness, too, they fashion with an immense phallus.

Gesta Hammaburgensis 26, Tschan's translation 164815

Later in the account Adam states that when a marriage is performed a libation is made to the image of Fricco.

Historians are divided on the reliability of Adam's account.

== Prose Edda ==
When Snorri Sturluson was writing in 13th century Iceland, the indigenous Germanic gods were still remembered although they had not been openly worshiped for more than two centuries.

=== Gylfaginning ===
In the Gylfaginning section of his Prose Edda, Snorri introduces Freyr as one of the major gods.

Njörðr í Nóatúnum gat síðan tvau börn, hét sonr Freyr en dóttir Freyja. Þau váru fögr álitum ok máttug. Freyr er hinn ágætasti af ásum. Hann ræðr fyrir regni ok skini sólar, ok þar með ávexti jarðar, ok á hann er gott at heita til árs ok friðar. Hann ræðr ok fésælu manna. Gylfaginning 24, EB's edition

Njördr in Nóatún begot afterward two children: the son was called Freyr, and the daughter Freyja; they were fair of face and mighty. Freyr is the most renowned of the Æsir; he rules over the rain and the shining of the sun, and therewithal the fruit of the earth; and it is good to call on him for fruitful seasons and peace. He governs also the prosperity of men. Gylfaginning XXIV, Brodeur's translation

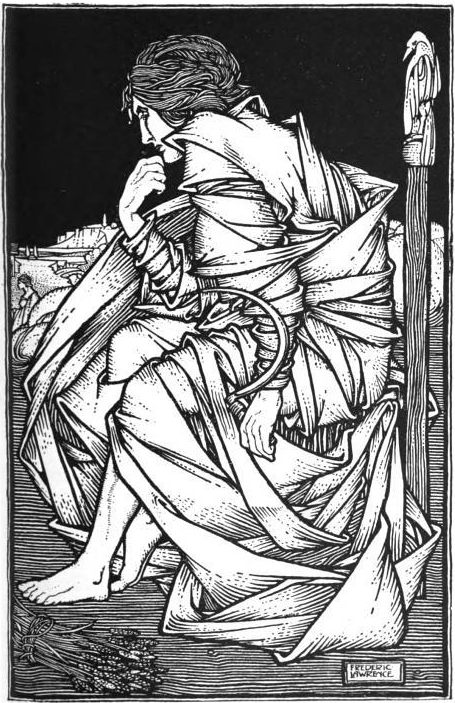
Seated on Odin's throne Hliðskjálf, the god Freyr sits in contemplation in an illustration (1908) by Frederic Lawrence

This description has similarities to the older account by Adam of Bremen but the differences are interesting. Adam assigns control of the weather and produce of the fields to Thor but Snorri says that Freyr rules over those areas. Snorri also omits any explicitly sexual references in Freyr's description. Those discrepancies can be explained in several ways. Adam and Snorri were writing with different goals in mind. It is possible that the Norse gods did not have exactly the same roles in Icelandic and Swedish paganism. Either Snorri or Adam may also have had distorted information.

The only extended myth related to Freyr in the Prose Edda is the story of his marriage.

Þat var einn dag er Freyr hafði gengit í Hliðskjálf ok sá of heima alla. En er hann leit í norðrætt, þá sá hann á einum bœ mikit hús ok fagrt, ok til þess húss gekk kona, ok er hon tók upp höndum ok lauk hurð fyrir sér þá lýsti af höndum hennar bæði í lopt ok á lög, ok allir heimar birtusk af henni. Gylfaginning 37, EB's edition

It chanced one day that Freyr had gone to Hlidskjálf, and gazed over all the world; but when he looked over into the northern region, he saw on an estate a house great and fair. And toward this house went a woman; when she raised her hands and opened the door before her, brightness gleamed from her hands, both over sky and sea, and all the worlds were illumined of her. Gylfaginning XXXVII, Brodeur's translation

The woman is Gerðr, a beautiful giantess. Freyr immediately falls in love with her and becomes depressed and taciturn. After a period of brooding, he consents to talk to Skírnir, his foot-page. He tells Skírnir that he has fallen in love with a beautiful woman and thinks he will die if he cannot have her. He asks Skírnir to go and woo her for him.

Þá svarar Skírnir, sagði svá at hann skal fara sendiferð en Freyr skal fá honum sverð sitt. Þat var svá gott sverð at sjálft vásk. En Freyr lét eigi þat til skorta ok gaf honum sverðit. Þá fór Skírnir ok bað honum konunnar ok fekk heitit hennar, ok níu nóttum síðar skyldi hon þar koma er Barey heitir ok ganga þá at brullaupinu með Frey. Gylfaginning 37, EB's edition

Then Skírnir answered thus: he would go on his errand, but Freyr should give him his own sword—which is so good that it fights of itself—and Freyr did not refuse, but gave him the sword. Then Skírnir went forth and wooed the woman for him, and received her promise; and nine nights later she was to come to the place called Barrey, and then go to the bridal with Freyr. Gylfaginning XXXVII, Brodeur's translation

The loss of Freyr's sword has consequences. According to the Prose Edda, Freyr had to fight Beli without his sword, and slew him with an antler. But the result at Ragnarök, the end of the world, will be much more serious. Freyr is fated to fight the fire-giant Surtr, and since he does not have his sword he will be defeated.

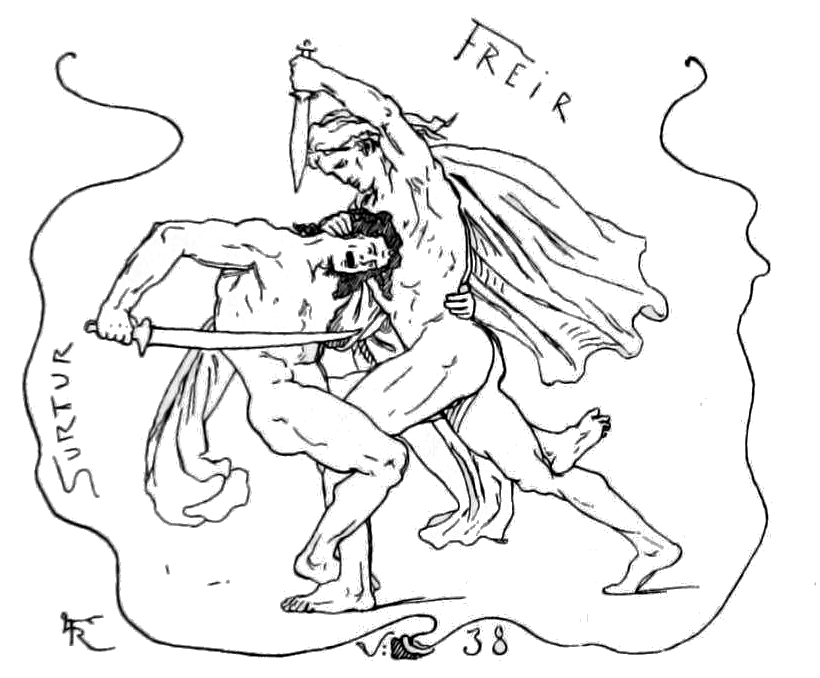
The final battle between Freyr and Surtr, illustration by Lorenz Frølich

Even after the loss of his weapon Freyr still has two magical artifacts, both dwarf-made. One is the ship Skíðblaðnir, which will have favoring breeze wherever its owner wants to go and can also be folded together like a napkin and carried in a pouch. The other is the boar Gullinbursti whose mane glows to illuminate the way for his owner. No myths involving Skíðblaðnir have come down to us but Snorri relates that Freyr rode to Baldr's funeral in a wagon pulled by Gullinbursti.

=== Skaldic poetry ===
Freyr is referred to several times in skaldic poetry. In Húsdrápa, partially preserved in the Prose Edda, he is said to ride a boar to Baldr's funeral.

Ríðr á börg til borgar böðfróðr sonar Óðins Freyr ok folkum stýrir fyrstr enum golli byrsta. Húsdrápa 7, FJ's edition	The battle-bold Freyr rideth First on the golden-bristled Barrow-boar to the bale-fire Of Baldr, and leads the people. Húsdrápa 7, Brodeur's translation

In a poem by Egill Skalla-Grímsson, Freyr is called upon along with Njörðr to drive Eric Bloodaxe from Norway. The same skald mentions in Arinbjarnarkviða that his friend has been blessed by the two gods.

[E]n Grjótbjörn of gæddan hefr Freyr ok Njörðr at féar afli. Arinbjarnarkviða 17, FJ's edition	Frey and Njord have endowed rock-bear with wealth's force. Arinbjarnarkviða 17, Scudder's translation

=== Nafnaþulur ===
In Nafnaþulur Freyr is said to ride the horse Blóðughófi (Bloody Hoof).

== Poetic Edda ==
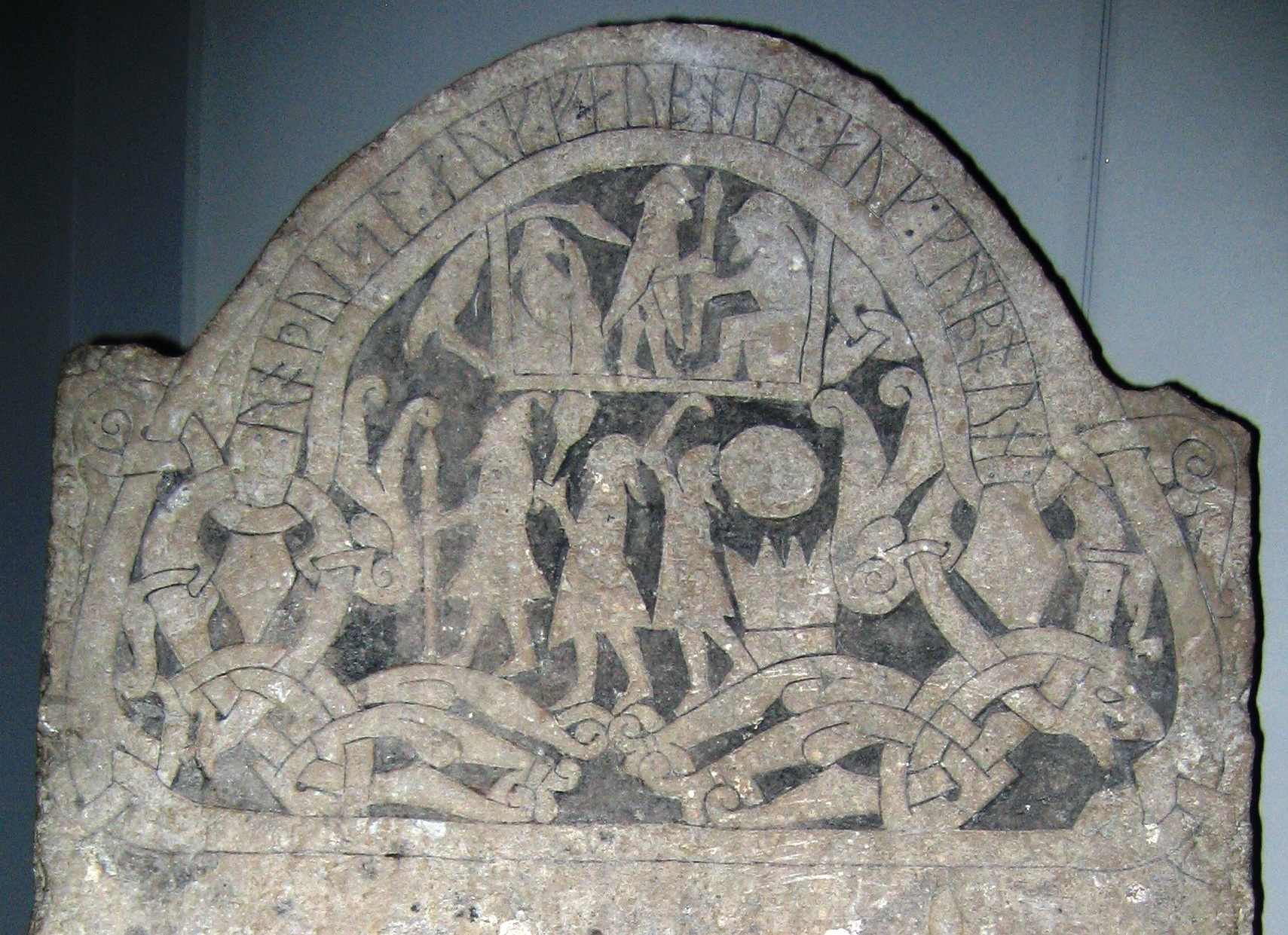
A detail from Gotland runestone G 181, in the Swedish Museum of National Antiquities in Stockholm. The three men are interpreted as Odin, Thor, and Freyr.

Freyr is mentioned in several of the poems in the Poetic Edda. The information there is largely consistent with that of the Prose Edda while each collection has some details not found in the other.

=== Völuspá ===
Völuspá, the best known of the Eddic poems, describes the final confrontation between Freyr and Surtr during Ragnarök.

Surtr fer sunnan með sviga lævi, skínn af sverði sól valtíva. Grjótbjörg gnata, en gífr rata, troða halir helveg, en himinn klofnar. Þá kømr Hlínar harmr annarr fram, er Óðinn ferr við úlf vega, en bani Belja bjartr at Surti, þá mun Friggjar falla angan. Völuspá 51–52, EB's edition	Surtr moves from the south with the scathe of branches: there shines from his sword the sun of Gods of the Slain. Stone peaks clash, and troll wives take to the road. Warriors tread the path from Hel, and heaven breaks apart. Then is fulfilled Hlín's second sorrow, when Óðinn goes to fight with the wolf, and Beli's slayer, bright, against Surtr. Then shall Frigg's sweet friend fall. Völuspá 50–51, Dronke's translation

Some scholars have preferred a slightly different translation, in which the sun shines "from the sword of the gods". The idea is that the sword which Surtr slays Freyr with is the "sword of the gods" which Freyr had earlier bargained away for Gerðr. This would add a further layer of tragedy to the myth. Sigurður Nordal argued for this view but the possibility represented by Ursula Dronke's translation above is equally possible.

=== Grímnismál ===
Grímnismál, a poem which largely consists of miscellaneous information about the gods, mentions Freyr's abode.

Alfheim Frey gáfu í árdaga tívar at tannféi. Grímnismál 5, GJ's edition	Alfheim the gods to Frey gave in days of yore for a tooth-gift. Grímnismál 5, Thorpe's translation

A tooth-gift was a gift given to an infant on the cutting of the first tooth. Since Alfheimr or Álfheimr means "World of Álfar (Elves)" the fact that Freyr should own it is one of the indications of a connection between the Vanir and the obscure Álfar. Grímnismál also mentions that the sons of Ívaldi made Skíðblaðnir for Freyr and that it is the best of ships.

=== Lokasenna ===
In the poem Lokasenna, Loki accuses the gods of various misdeeds. He criticizes the Vanir for incest, saying that Njörðr had Freyr with his sister. He also states that the gods discovered Freyr and Freyja having sex together. The god Týr speaks up in Freyr's defense.

Freyr er beztr allra ballriða ása görðum í; mey hann né grætir né manns konu ok leysir ór höftum hvern. Lokasenna 37, GJ's edition	Frey is best of all the exalted gods in the Æsir's courts: no maid he makes to weep, no wife of man, and from bonds looses all. Lokasenna 37, Thorpe's translation

Lokasenna also mentions that Freyr has servants called Byggvir and Beyla. They seem to have been associated with the making of bread.

=== Skírnismál ===
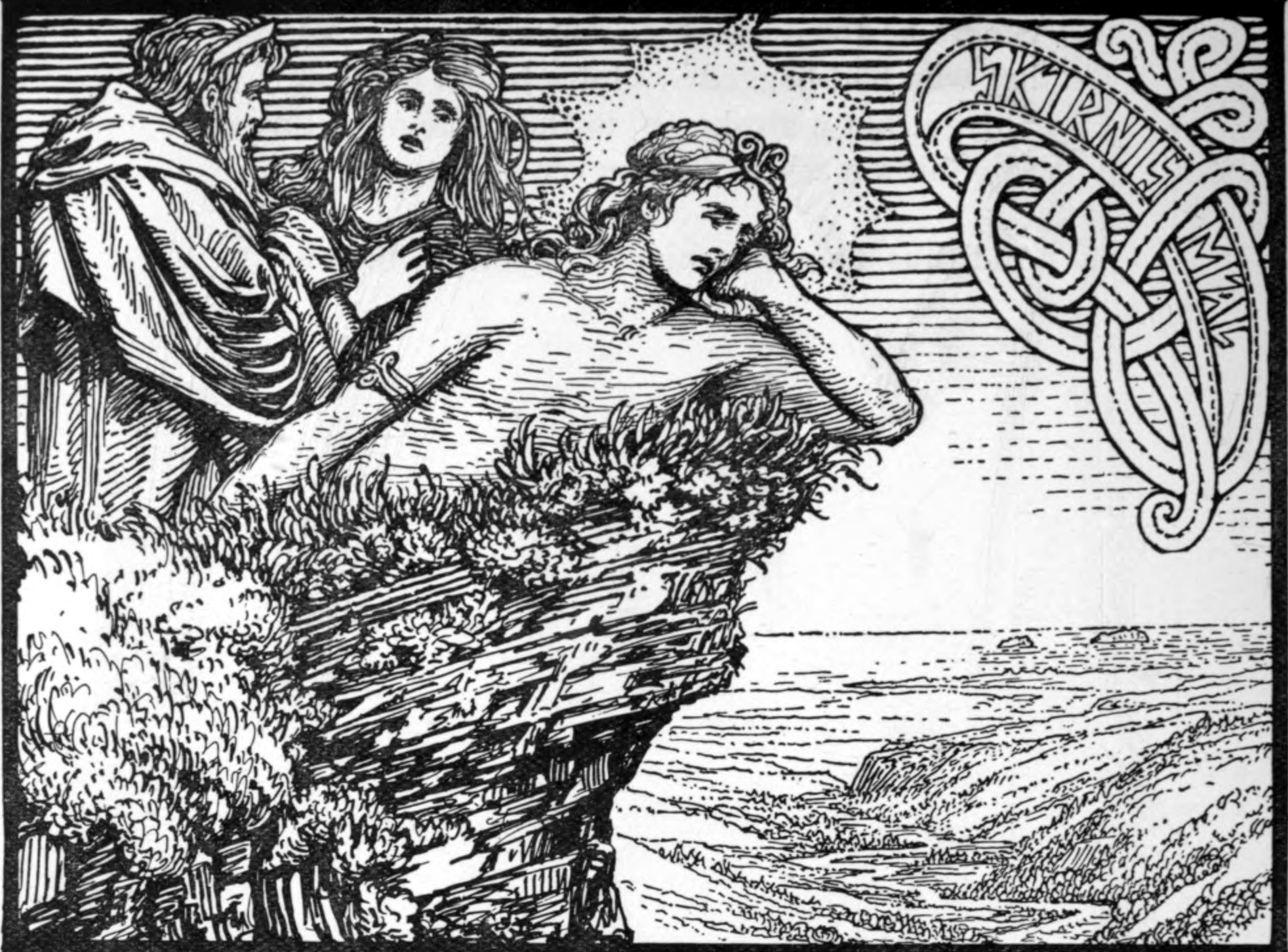
"The Lovesickness of Frey" (1908) by W. G. Collingwood.

The courtship of Freyr and Gerðr is dealt with extensively in the poem Skírnismál. Freyr is depressed after seeing Gerðr. Njörðr and Skaði ask Skírnir to go and talk with him. Freyr reveals the cause of his grief and asks Skírnir to go to Jötunheimr to woo Gerðr for him. Freyr gives Skírnir a steed and his magical sword for the journey.

Mar ek þér þann gef, er þik um myrkvan berr vísan vafrloga, ok þat sverð, er sjalft mun vegask ef sá er horskr, er hefr. Skírnismál 9, GJ's edition	My steed I lend thee to lift thee o'er the weird ring of flickering flame, the sword also which swings itself, if wise be he who wields it. Skírnismál 9, Hollander's translation

Skírnir goes to the hall of the Giant Gymir, the father of Gerðr. When Skírnir finds Gerðr he starts by offering her treasures if she will rendezvous with Freyr. When she declines he forces her to accept by threatening her with destructive magic.

== Ynglinga saga ==
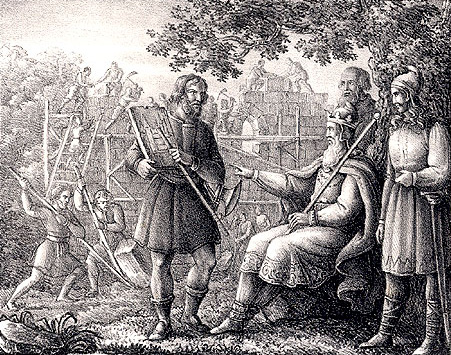
Yngvi-Freyr constructs the Temple at Uppsala in this early 19th century artwork by Hugo Hamilton.

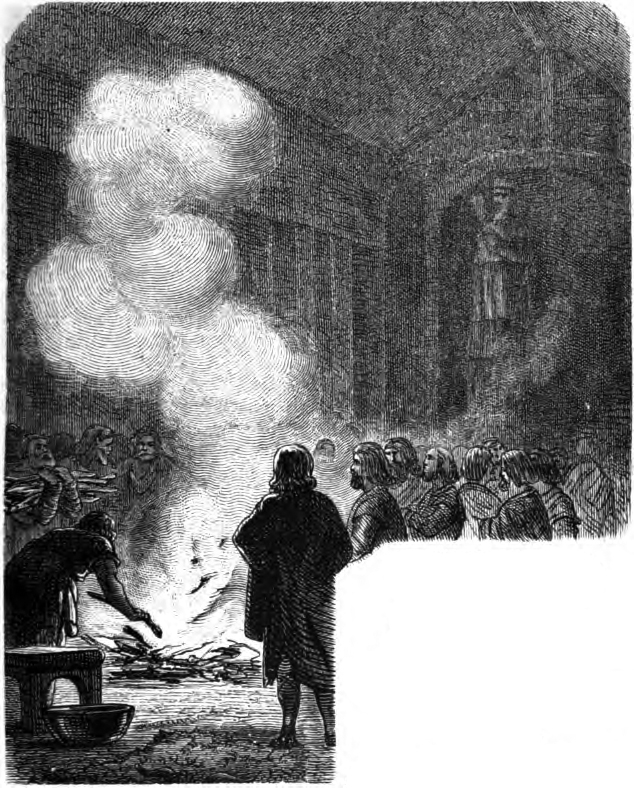
"In Freyr's Temple near Uppsala" (1882) by Friedrich Wilhelm Heine.

Snorri Sturluson starts his epic history of the kings of Norway with Ynglinga saga, a euhemerized account of the Norse gods. Here Odin and the Æsir are men from Asia who gain power through their prowess in war and Odin's skills. But when Odin attacks the Vanir he bites off more than he can chew and peace is negotiated after the destructive and indecisive Æsir-Vanir War. Hostages are exchanged to seal the peace deal and the Vanir send Freyr and Njörðr to live with the Æsir. At this point the saga, like Lokasenna, mentions that incest was practised among the Vanir.

Þá er Njörðr var með Vönum, þá hafði hann átta systur sína, því at þat váru þar lög; váru þeirra börn Freyr ok Freyja. En þat var bannat með Ásum at byggja svá náit at frændsemi. Ynglinga saga 4, Schultz's edition

While Njord was with the Vanaland people he had taken his own sister in marriage, for that was allowed by their law; and their children were Frey and Freya. But among the Asaland people it was forbidden to intermarry with such near relations. Ynglinga saga 4, Laing's translation

Odin makes Njörðr and Freyr priests of sacrifices and they become influential leaders. Odin goes on to conquer the North and settles in Sweden where he rules as king, collects taxes and maintains sacrifices. After Odin's death, Njörðr takes the throne. During his rule there is peace and good harvest and the Swedes come to believe that Njörðr controls these things. Eventually Njörðr falls ill and dies.

Freyr tók þá ríki eptir Njörð; var hann kallaðr dróttinn yfir Svíum ok tók skattgjafir af þeim; hann var vinsæll ok ársæll sem faðir hans. Freyr reisti at Uppsölum hof mikit, ok setti þar höfuðstað sinn; lagði þar til allar skyldir sínar, lönd ok lausa aura; þá hófst Uppsala auðr, ok hefir haldizt æ síðan. Á hans dögum hófst Fróða friðr, þá var ok ár um öll lönd; kendu Svíar þat Frey. Var hann því meir dýrkaðr en önnur goðin, sem á hans dögum varð landsfólkit auðgara en fyrr af friðinum ok ári. Gerðr Gýmis dóttir hét kona hans; sonr þeirra hét Fjölnir. Freyr hét Yngvi öðru nafni; Yngva nafn var lengi síðan haft í hans ætt fyrir tignarnafn, ok Ynglingar váru síðan kallaðir hans ættmenn. Freyr tók sótt; en er at honum leið sóttin, leituðu menn sér ráðs, ok létu fá menn til hans koma, en bjoggu haug mikinn, ok létu dyrr á ok 3 glugga. En er Freyr var dauðr, báru þeir hann leyniliga í hauginn, ok sögðu Svíum at hann lifði, ok varðveittu hann þar 3 vetr. En skatt öllum heltu þeir í hauginn, í einn glugg gullinu, en í annan silfrinu, í hinn þriðja eirpenningum. Þá hélzt ár ok friðr. Ynglinga saga 12, Schultz's edition

Frey took the kingdom after Njord, and was called drot by the Swedes, and they paid taxes to him. He was, like his father, fortunate in friends and in good seasons. Frey built a great temple at Upsal, made it his chief seat, and gave it all his taxes, his land, and goods. Then began the Upsal domains, which have remained ever since. Then began in his days the Frode-peace; and then there were good seasons, in all the land, which the Swedes ascribed to Frey, so that he was more worshipped than the other gods, as the people became much richer in his days by reason of the peace and good seasons. His wife was called Gerd, daughter of Gymir, and their son was called Fjolne. Frey was called by another name, Yngve; and this name Yngve was considered long after in his race as a name of honour, so that his descendants have since been called Ynglinger. Frey fell into a sickness; and as his illness took the upper hand, his men took the plan of letting few approach him. In the meantime they raised a great mound, in which they placed a door with three holes in it. Now when Frey died they bore him secretly into the mound, but told the Swedes he was alive; and they kept watch over him for three years. They brought all the taxes into the mound, and through the one hole they put in the gold, through the other the silver, and through the third the copper money that was paid. Peace and good seasons continued. Ynglinga saga 12, Laing's translation

Þá er allir Svíar vissu, at Freyr var dauðr, en hélzt ár ok friðr, þá trúðu þeir, at svá mundi vera, meðan Freyr væri á Svíþjóð, ok vildu eigi brenna hann, ok kölluðu hann veraldar goð ok blótuðu mest til árs ok friðar alla ævi síðan. Ynglinga saga 13, Schultz's edition

When it became known to the Swedes that Frey was dead, and yet peace and good seasons continued, they believed that it must be so as long as Frey remained in Sweden; and therefore they would not burn his remains, but called him the god of this world, and afterwards offered continually blood-sacrifices to him, principally for peace and good seasons. Ynglinga saga 13, Laing's translation

Freyr had a son named Fjölnir, who succeeds him as king and rules during the continuing period of peace and good seasons. Fjölnir's descendants are enumerated in Ynglingatal which describes the mythological kings of Sweden.

== Ögmundar þáttr dytts ==
The 14th century Icelandic Ögmundar þáttr dytts contains a tradition of how Freyr was transported in a wagon and administered by a priestess, in Sweden. Freyr's role as a fertility god needed a female counterpart in a divine couple (McKinnell's translation 1987):

Great heathen sacrifices were held there at that time, and for a long while Frey had been the god who was worshipped most there – and so much power had been gained by Frey's statue that the devil used to speak to people out of the mouth of the idol, and a young and beautiful woman had been obtained to serve Frey. It was the faith of the local people that Frey was alive, as seemed to some extent to be the case, and they thought he would need to have a sexual relationship with his wife; along with Frey she was to have complete control over the temple settlement and all that belonged to it.

In this short story, a man named Gunnar was suspected of manslaughter and escaped to Sweden, where Gunnar became acquainted with this young priestess. He helped her drive Freyr's wagon with the god effigy in it, but the god did not appreciate Gunnar and so attacked him and would have killed Gunnar if he had not promised himself to return to the Christian faith if he would make it back to Norway. When Gunnar had promised this, a demon jumped out of the god effigy and so Freyr was nothing but a piece of wood. Gunnar destroyed the wooden idol and dressed himself as Freyr, then Gunnar and the priestess travelled across Sweden where people were happy to see the god visiting them. After a while he made the priestess pregnant, but this was seen by the Swedes as confirmation that Freyr was truly a fertility god and not a scam. Finally, Gunnar had to flee back to Norway with his young bride and had her baptized at the court of Olaf Tryggvason.

== Other Icelandic sources ==
Worship of Freyr is alluded to in several Icelanders' sagas.

The protagonist of Hrafnkels saga is a priest of Freyr. He dedicates a horse to the god and kills a man for riding it, setting in motion a chain of fateful events.

In Gísla saga a chieftain named Þorgrímr Freysgoði is an ardent worshipper of Freyr. When he dies he is buried in a howe.

Varð og sá hlutur einn er nýnæmum þótti gegna að aldrei festi snæ utan og sunnan á haugi Þorgríms og eigi fraus; og gátu menn þess til að hann myndi Frey svo ávarður fyrir blótin að hann myndi eigi vilja að freri á milli þeirra.

And now, too, a thing happened which seemed strange and new. No snow lodged on the south side of Thorgrim's howe, nor did it freeze there. And men guessed it was because Thorgrim had been so dear to Frey for his worship's sake that the god would not suffer the frost to come between them. -

Hallfreðar saga, Víga-Glúms saga and Vatnsdœla saga also mention Freyr.

Other Icelandic sources referring to Freyr include Íslendingabók, Landnámabók, and Hervarar saga.

Íslendingabók, written c. 1125, is the oldest Icelandic source that mentions Freyr, including him in a genealogy of Swedish kings. Landnámabók includes a heathen oath to be sworn at an assembly where Freyr, Njörðr, and "the almighty áss" are invoked. Hervarar saga mentions a Yuletide sacrifice of a boar to Freyr.

== Gesta Danorum ==
The 12th Century Danish Gesta Danorum describes Freyr, under the name Frø, as the "viceroy of the gods".

Frø quoque deorum satrapa sedem haud procul Upsala cepit, ubi veterem litationis morem tot gentibus ac saeculis usurpatum tristi infandoque piaculo mutavit. Siquidem humani generis hostias mactare aggressus foeda superis libamenta persolvit. Gesta Danorum 3, Olrik's edition

There was also a viceroy of the gods, Frø, who took up residence not far from Uppsala and altered the ancient system of sacrifice practised for centuries among many peoples to a morbid and unspeakable form of expiation. He delivered abominable offerings to the powers above by instituting the slaughter of human victims. Gesta Danorum 3, Fisher's translation

That Freyr had a cult at Uppsala is well confirmed from other sources. The reference to the change in sacrificial ritual may also reflect some historical memory. There is archaeological evidence for an increase in human sacrifices in the late Viking Age though among the Norse gods human sacrifice is most often linked to Odin. Another reference to Frø and sacrifices is found earlier in the work, where the beginning of an annual blót to him is related. King Hadingus is cursed after killing a divine being and atones for his crime with a sacrifice.

Siquidem propitiandorum numinum gratia Frø deo rem divinam furvis hostiis fecit. Quem litationis morem annuo feriarum circuitu repetitum posteris imitandum reliquit. Frøblot Sueones vocant. Gesta Danorum 1, Olrik's edition

[I]n order to mollify the divinities he did indeed make a holy sacrifice of dark-coloured victims to the god Frø. He repeated this mode of propitiation at an annual festival and left it to be imitated by his descendants. The Swedes call it Frøblot. Gesta Danorum 1, Fisher's translation

The sacrifice of dark-coloured victims to Freyr has a parallel in Ancient Greek religion where the chthonic fertility deities preferred dark-coloured victims to lighter ones.

In book 9, Saxo identifies Frø as the "king of Sweden" (rex Suetiae):

Quo tempore rex Suetiae Frø, interfecto Norvagiensium rege Sywardo, coniuges necessariorum eius prostibulo relegatas publice constuprandas exhibuit. Gesta Danorum 9, Olrik's edition

About this time the Swedish ruler Frø, after killing Sivard, king of the Norwegians, removed the wives of Sivard's relatives to a brothel and exposed them to public prostitution. Gesta Danorum 9, Fisher's translation

The reference to public prostitution may be a memory of fertility cult practices. Such a memory may also be the source of a description in book 6 of the stay of Starcatherus, a follower of Odin, in Sweden.

Mortuo autem Bemono, Starcatherus ab athletis Biarmensibus ob virtutem accitus, cum plurima apud eos memoratu digna edidisset facinora, Sueonum fines ingreditur. Ubi cum filiis Frø septennio feriatus ab his tandem ad Haconem Daniae tyrannum se contulit, quod apud Upsalam sacrificiorum tempore constitutus effeminatos corporum motus scaenicosque mimorum plausus ac mollia nolarum crepitacula fastidiret. Unde patet, quam remotum a lascivia animum habuerit, qui ne eius quidem spectator esse sustinuit. Adeo virtus luxui resistit. Gesta Danorum 6, Olrik's edition

After Bemoni's death Starkather, because of his valour, was summoned by the Biarmian champions and there performed many feats worthy of the tellings. Then he entered Swedish territory where he spent seven years in a leisurely stay with the sons of Frø, after which he departed to join Haki, the lord of Denmark, for, living at Uppsala in the period of sacrifices, he had become disgusted with the womanish body movements, the clatter of actors on the stage and the soft tinkling of bells. It is obvious how far his heart was removed from frivolity if he could not even bear to watch these occasions. A manly individual is resistant to wantonness. Gesta Danorum 6, Fisher's translation

== Yngvi ==
A strophe of the Anglo-Saxon rune poem (c. 1100) records that:

Ing was first among the East Danes seen by men

This may refer to the origins of the worship of Ingui in the tribal areas that Tacitus mentions in his Germania as being populated by the Inguieonnic tribes. A later Danish chronicler lists Ingui was one of three brothers that the Danish tribes descended from. The strophe also states that "then he (Ingui) went back over the waves, his wagon behind him" which could connect Ingui to earlier conceptions of the wagon processions of Nerthus and the later Scandinavian conceptions of Freyr's wagon journeys.

Ingui is mentioned also in some later Anglo-Saxon literature under varying forms of his name, such as "For what doth Ingeld have to do with Christ" and the variants used in Beowulf to designate the kings as 'leader of the friends of Ing'. The compound Ingui-Frea (OE) and Yngvi-Freyr (ON) likely refer to the connection between the god and the Germanic kings' role as priests during the sacrifices in the pagan period, as Frea and Freyr are titles meaning 'Lord'.

The Swedish royal dynasty was known as the Ynglings from their descent from Yngvi-Freyr. This is supported by Tacitus, who wrote about the Germans: "In their ancient songs, their only way of remembering or recording the past they celebrate an earth-born god Tuisco, and his son Mannus, as the origin of their race, as their founders. To Mannus they assign three sons, from whose names, they say, the coast tribes are called Ingaevones; those of the interior, Herminones; all the rest, Istaevones".

== Archaeological record ==
=== Rällinge statuette ===
In 1904, a Viking Age statuette identified as a depiction of Freyr was discovered on the farm Rällinge in Lunda, Södermanland parish in the province of Södermanland, Sweden. The depiction features a cross-legged seated, bearded male with an erect penis. He is wearing a pointed cap or helmet and stroking his triangular beard. The seven-centimeter-tall statue is displayed at the Swedish Museum of National Antiquities.

=== Skog tapestry ===
A part of the Swedish Skog tapestry depicts three figures that have been interpreted as allusions to Odin, Thor, and Freyr, but also as the three Scandinavian holy kings Canute, Eric and Olaf. The figures coincide with 11th century descriptions of statue arrangements recorded by Adam of Bremen at the Temple at Uppsala and written accounts of the gods during the late Viking Age. The tapestry is originally from Hälsingland, Sweden but is now housed at the Swedish Museum of National Antiquities.

=== Gullgubber ===
Small pieces of gold foil featuring engravings dating from the Migration Period into the early Viking Age (known as gullgubber) have been discovered in various locations in Scandinavia, at one site almost 2,500. The foil pieces have been found largely on the sites of buildings, only rarely in graves. The figures are sometimes single, occasionally an animal, sometimes a man and a woman with a leafy bough between them, facing or embracing one another. The human figures are almost always clothed and are sometimes depicted with their knees bent. Scholar Hilda Ellis Davidson says that it has been suggested that the figures are taking part in a dance, and that they may have been connected with weddings, as well as linked to the Vanir group of gods, representing the notion of a divine marriage, such as in the Poetic Edda poem Skírnismál; the coming together of Gerðr and Freyr.

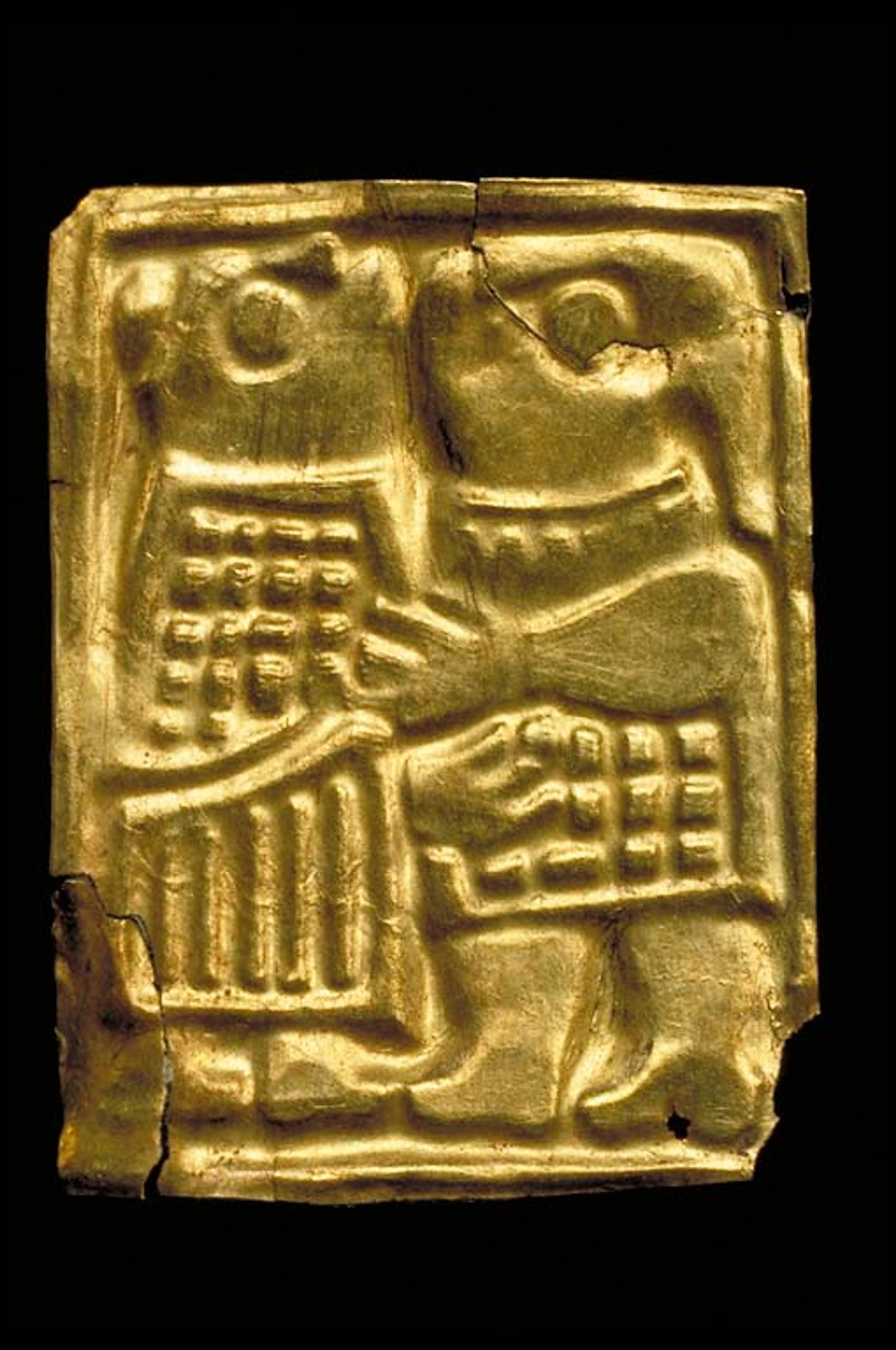

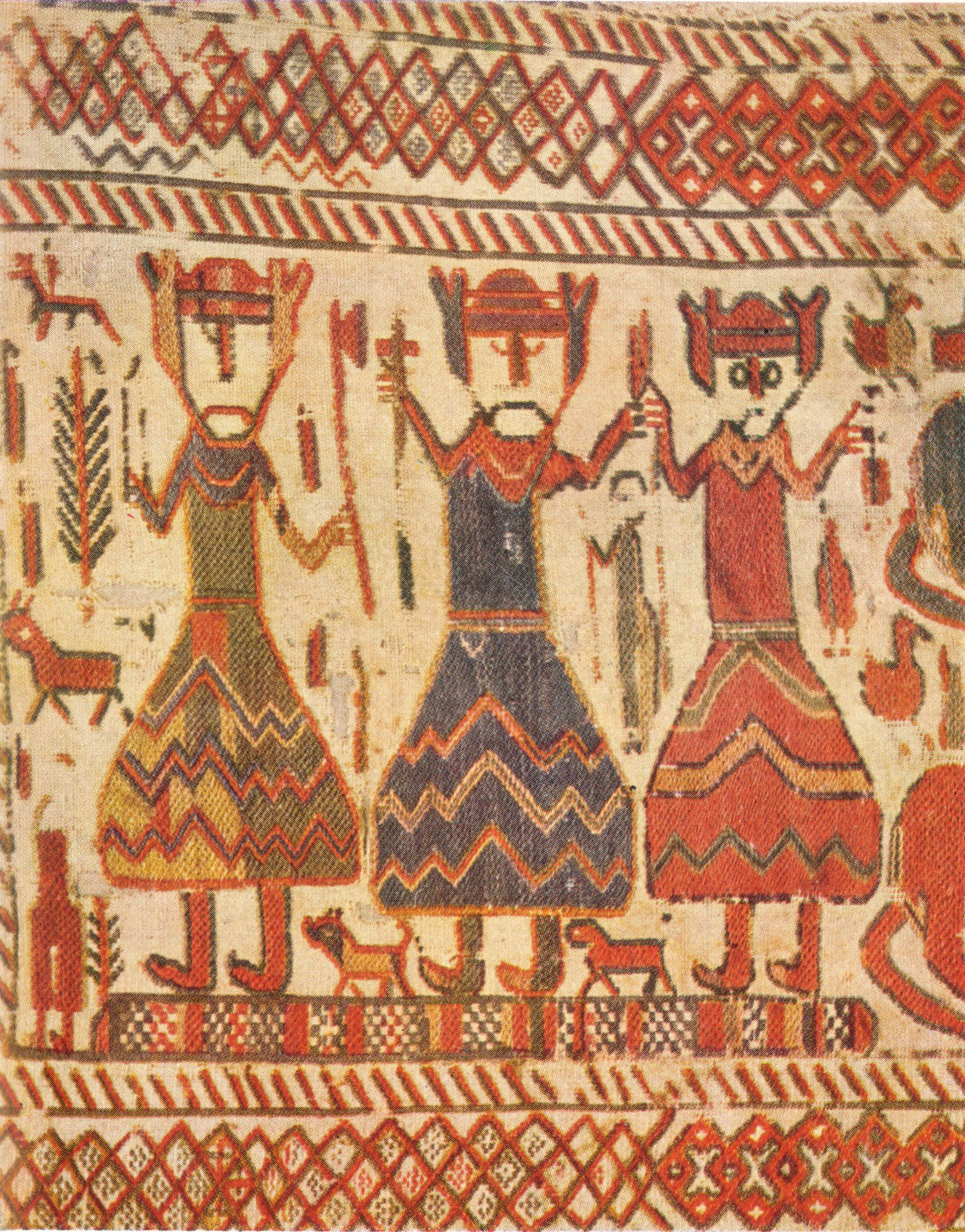
The Skog Church Tapestry portion possibly depicting Odin, Thor and Freyr

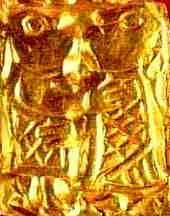
An example of the small gold pieces of foil that may depict Gerðr and Freyr

== Toponyms ==
=== Norway ===
- Freysakr ("Freyr's field") - name of two old farms in Gol Municipality and Torpa Municipality.
- Freyshof ("Freyr's temple") - name of two old farms in Hole Municipality and Trøgstad Municipality.
- Freysland ("Freyr's land/field") - name of six old farms in Feda Municipality, Halse og Harkmark Municipality, Førde Municipality, Sogndal Municipality, Søgne Municipality, and Torpa Municipality.
- Freyslíð ("Freyr's hill") - name of two old farms in Lunner Municipality and Torpa Municipality.
- Freysnes ("Freyr's headland") - name of an old farm in Sandnes Municipality.
- Freyssetr ("Freyr's farm") - name of two old farms in Masfjorden Municipality and Soknedal Municipality.
- Freyssteinn ("Freyr's stone") - name of an old farm in Lista Municipality.
- Freysteigr ("Freyr's field") - name of an old farm in Ramnes Municipality.
- Freysvík ("Freyr's inlet/bay") - name of two old farms in Vik Municipality and Ullensvang Municipality.
- Freysvin ("Freyr's meadow") - name of four old farms in Hole Municipality, Lom Municipality, Sunnylven Municipality, and Østre Gausdal Municipality.
- Freysvǫllr ("Freyr's field") - name of an old farm in Sør-Odal Municipality.
- Freysþveit ("Freyr's thwaite") - name of an old farm in Hedrum Municipality.

=== Sweden ===
- Fröslunda ("Freyr's grove") - Uppland
- Frösåker ("Freyr's field") - Uppland
- Frösön ("Freyr's island") - Jämtland
- Fröseke ("Freyr's oak forest") - Småland
- Frösve ("Freyr's sanctuary") - Västergötland
- Frösakull ("Freyr's hill") – Halland

=== Denmark ===
- Frøs Herred ("Freyr's Shire") - Southern Jutland

== Modern influence ==
Freyr appears in numerous works of modern art and literature. He appears, for example, alongside numerous other figures from Norse mythology in the Danish poet Adam Gottlob Oehlenschläger's Nordens Guder (1819). He also appears in Icelandic poet Gerður Kristný's Blóðhófnir (2010), a feminist retelling of the Eddic poem Skírnismál that won the 2010 Icelandic Literature Award.

== See also ==
- List of Germanic deities

== Notes ==
Preceded by Njörðr	Mythological king of Sweden	Succeeded by Fjölnir
