= Skírnismál =

Eddic poem

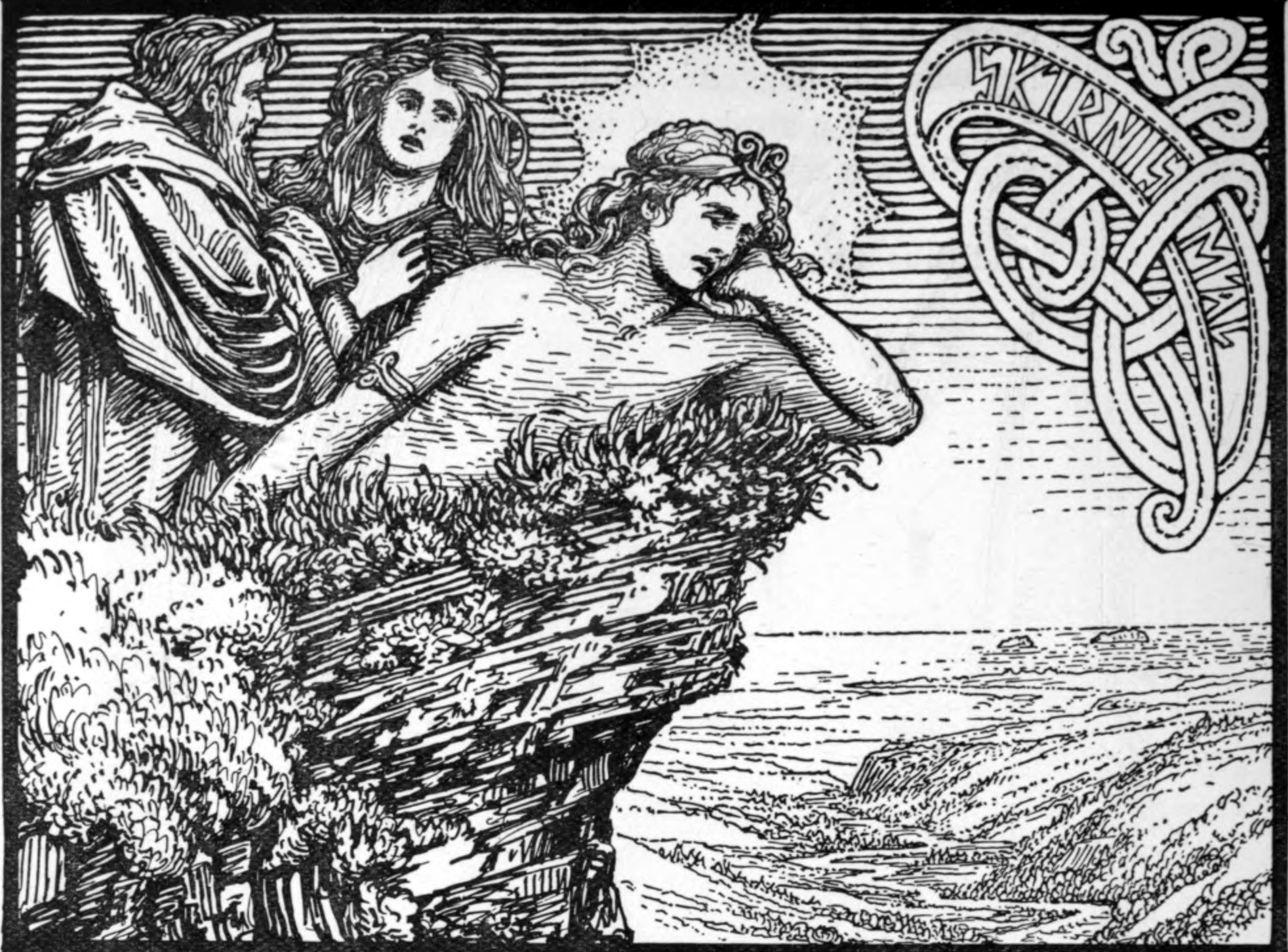
"The Lovesickness of Frey" (1908) by W.G. Collingwood.

Skírnismál (Old Norse: 'The Lay of Skírnir', but in the Codex Regius known as Fǫr Skírnis ‘Skírnir’s journey’) is one of the poems of the Poetic Edda. It is preserved in the 13th-century manuscripts Codex Regius and AM 748 I 4to but may have been originally composed in the early 10th century. An account of much the same story as given in the poem is also offered in Snorri Sturluson's Prose Edda, which quotes what in the Codex Regius text is the last stanza of the poem.

== Synopsis ==
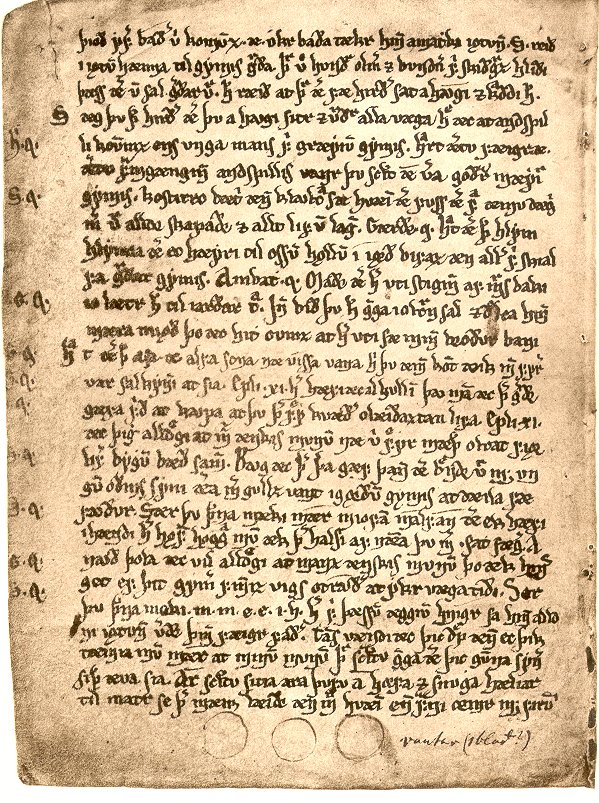
AM 748 I 4^{to}, one of the two manuscripts to preserve Skírnismál, has notes on the margin indicating the speaker of each verse. Some scholars consider this a clue that the poem might have been performed as ritual drama.

The prose prologue to the poem says that the god Freyr, the son of Njörðr, sits in Odin's throne, Hliðskjálf and looked over all the worlds. On looking to Jötunheimr, the land of the giants, Freyr sees a beautiful girl, Gerðr, and is immediately seized by desire. Fearing that the object of his heart's desire is unattainable, gloom settles upon him.

The poem itself starts with the wife of Njörðr, Skaði, bidding Skírnir to ask Freyr why he is so sad. Freyr's response is sullen, yet he does confess his feelings and asks Skírnir to undertake a journey to woo Gerðr on Freyr's behalf. Skírnir agrees, and Freyr furnishes him with his magical steed and sword.

Skírnir makes his way to Jötunheimr, and eventually arrives at the hall of the giant Gymir. Gerðr, the daughter of Gymir, greets him; Skírnir immediately sets about trying to set up a sexual rendezvous between Gerðr and Freyr. He tries bribing her first with gifts, but when these are refused, he is quick to turn to coercion, with threats of violence and curses. Gerðr has no choice but to submit to Skírnir's wishes and agree to the rendezvous with Freyr.

Seest thou, maiden, this keen, bright sword
That I hold here in my hand?
Before its blade the old giant bends,—
Thy father is doomed to die.
...
I strike thee, maid, with my gambantein,
To tame thee to work my will;
There shalt thou go where never again
The sons of men shall see thee.

In Snorri Sturluson's version of the tale, Skírnir successfully woos Gerðr without threatening to curse her.

Skírnir returns to Asgard and reports to Freyr, who asks him:

Tell me, Skírnir, before unsaddling

Or stepping forth another pace
Is the news you bring from Jotunheim
For better or for worse?

Skírnir replies:

In the woods of Barri, which know we both so well,
A quiet still and tranquil place
In nine nights time to Njörd's son
Will Gerd give herself.

Freyr responds:

One night is long enough, yet longer still are two;
How then shall I contend with three?
For months have passed more quickly
Than half a bridal eve.

== Curses ==
Twentieth-century scholarship tended to look upon the sexual relationship between Freyr and Gerðr as a hieros gamos ("divine marriage"), supposedly linked to ideas about agricultural fertility. Stephen A. Mitchell argued that the poem represented a kind of social charter: a model for conflict resolution, literally depicting conflict-resolution between gods and giants but metaphorically modelling resolutions between opposed ethnic groups more generally.

Subsequent scholarship has focused more on the coercive character of Skírnir's acquisition of Freyr for Gerðr. There is material evidence that the contemporary audience of Skírnismál believed in the effectiveness of curses like Skírnir's and even attempted to employ them; in particular, in 1964, Aslak Liestøl published the thirteenth-century Bergen rune-charm, which contains a curse that is notably similar to the curse Skírnir's threatened Gerðr with. Liestøl asserted that the runic inscription is a genuine spell, and was intended to work on a real woman. Another parallel for Skírnir's curse is the curse known as Buslubæn in Bósa saga.

Carolyne Larrington outlines the different elements of the curse Gerðr is threatened with:

1. She will be invisible, but also a public spectacle.
2. She will experience intolerable sexual frustration.
3. She will have a "physically repulsive" husband.
4. She will fall to a low social status, and will lose the little autonomy she has.
5. She will experience "[m]ale, authoritarian disapproval".

== Cultural references ==
The Misty Mountains of J. R. R. Tolkien's The Hobbit are likely to have been inspired by the úrig fiöll in the Skírnismál. Tolkien was familiar with the Poetic Edda.
