= Víðarr =

Norse deity

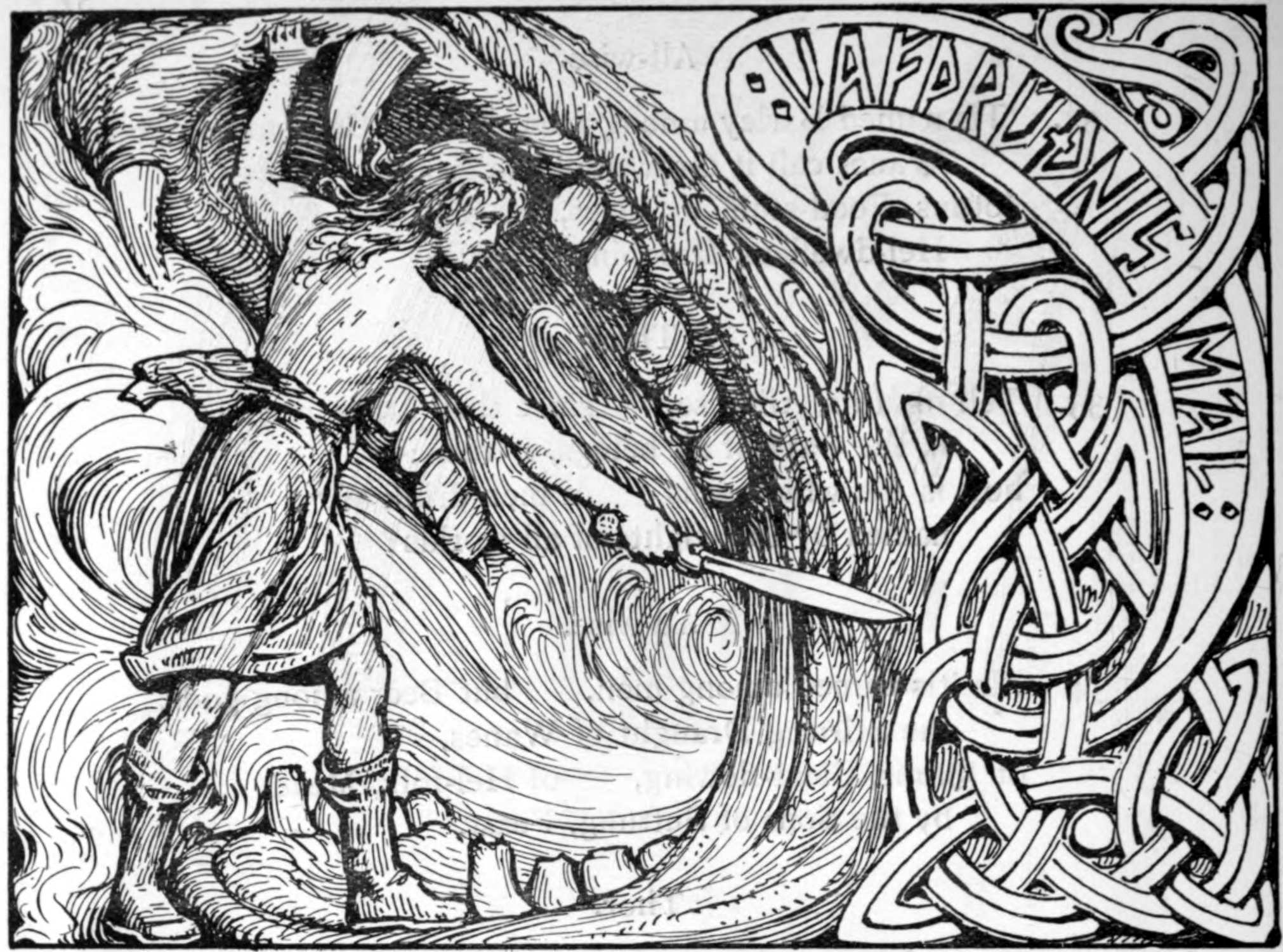
A depiction of Víðarr stabbing Fenrir while holding his jaws apart by W. G. Collingwood, 1908, inspired by the Gosforth Cross

In Norse mythology, Víðarr (Old Norse: [ˈwiːðɑrː], possibly "wide ruler", sometimes anglicized as Vidar /ˈviːdɑːr/, Vithar, Vidarr, and Vitharr) is a god among the Æsir associated with vengeance. Víðarr is described as the son of Odin and the jötunn Gríðr and is foretold to avenge his father's death by killing the wolf Fenrir at Ragnarök, a conflict he is described as surviving. Víðarr is attested in the Poetic Edda, compiled in the 13th century from earlier traditional sources, the Prose Edda, written in the 13th century by Snorri Sturluson, and is interpreted as depicted with Fenrir on the Gosforth Cross. A number of theories surround the figure, including theories around potential ritual silence and a Proto-Indo-European basis.

== Attestations ==
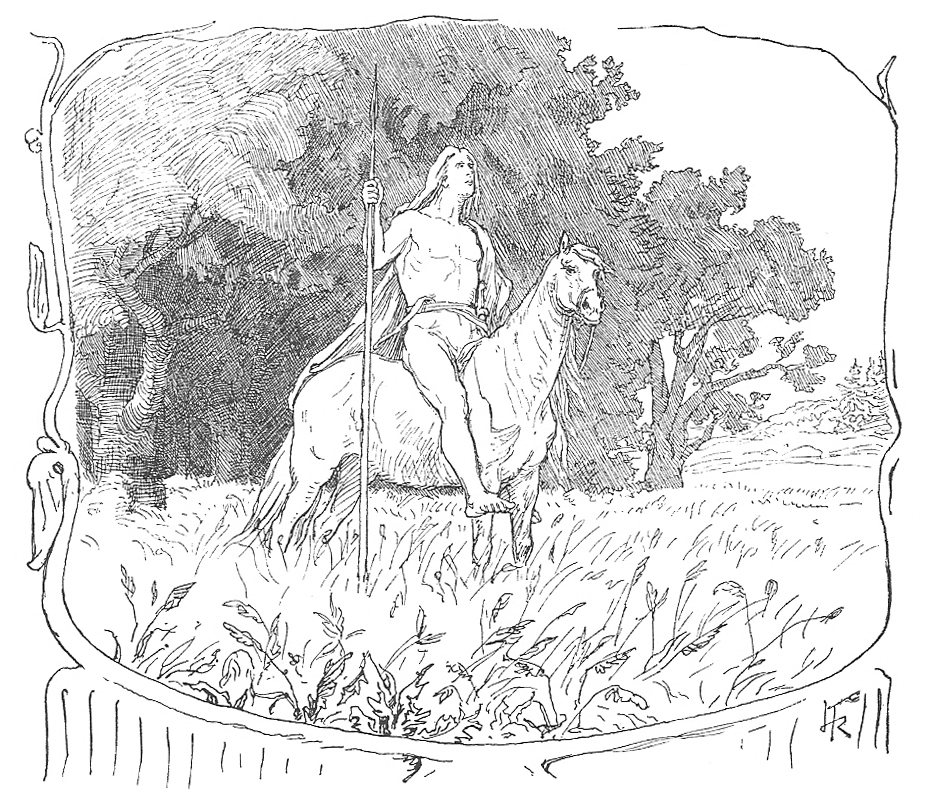
A depiction of Víðarr on horseback by Lorenz Frølich, 1895

=== Poetic Edda ===
In the Poetic Edda, Víðarr is mentioned in the poems Völuspá, Vafthrúdnismál, Grímnismál, and Lokasenna.

In stanzas 54 and 55 of the poem Völuspá, a völva tells Odin that his son Víðarr will avenge Odin's death at Ragnarök by stabbing Fenrir in the heart:

Then comes Sigfather's | mighty son,
Viðarr, to fight | with the foaming wolf;
In the giant's son | does he thrust his sword
Full to the heart: | his father is avenged.

In stanzas 51 and 53 of Vafthrúdnismál, Vafþrúðnir states that Víðarr and his brother Váli will both live in the "temples of the gods" after Surtr's fire has ceded and that Víðarr will avenge the death of his father, Odin, by sundering the cold jaws of Fenrir in battle:

Stanza 51: "In the gods' home Vithar | and Vali shall dwell, When the fires of Surt have sunk; Mothi and Magni | shall Mjollnir have When Vingnir falls in fight."	Stanza 53: "The wolf shall fell | the father of men, And this shall Vithar avenge; The terrible jaws | shall he tear apart, And so the wolf shall he slay."

In stanza 17 of Grímnismál, during Odin's visions of various dwelling places of the gods, he describes Víðarr's (anglicized as "Vidar") residence:

Brushwood grows and high grass
widely in Vidar's land
and there the son proclaims on his horse's back
that he's keen to avenge his father.

According to Lokasenna, Loki rebukes the gods at the start of the poem for not properly welcoming him to the feast at Ægir's hall. In stanza 10, Odin finally relents to the rules of hospitality, urging Víðarr to stand and pour a drink for the quarrelsome guest. Víðarr follows his orders. Loki toasts the Æsir before beginning his flyting.

=== Prose Edda ===
Víðarr is referenced in the Prose Edda books Gylfaginning and Skáldskaparmál.

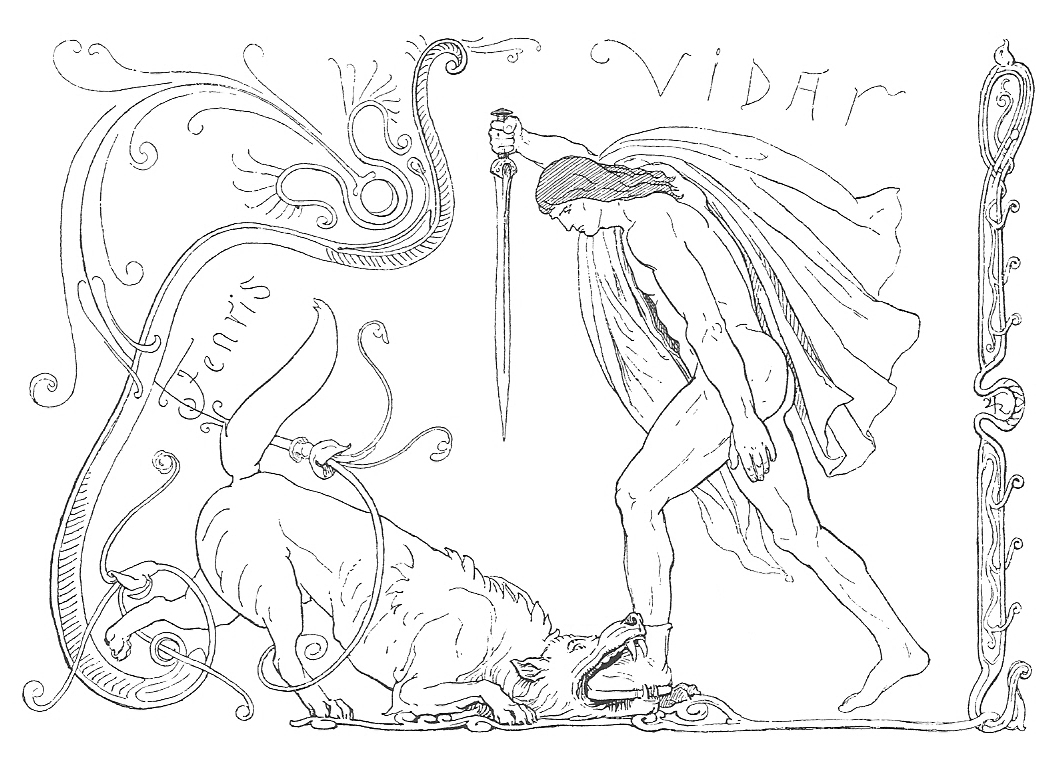
A depiction of Víðarr defeating Fenrir by Lorenz Frølich, 1895

Víðarr is referenced in the book Gylfaginning in chapters 29, 51, and 53. In chapter 29, Víðarr is introduced by the enthroned figure of High as "the silent god" with a thick shoe, that he is nearly as strong as the god Thor, and that the gods rely on him in times of immense difficulties.

In chapter 51, High foretells that, during Ragnarök, the wolf Fenrir will devour Odin, and Víðarr will avenge him by stepping down with one foot on the lower jaw of the monster, grabbing his upper jaw in one hand and tearing his mouth apart, killing him. Víðarr's "thick shoe" is described as consisting of all the extra leather pieces that people have cut from their own shoes at the toe and heel, collected by the god throughout all time. Therefore, anyone who is concerned enough to give assistance to the gods should throw these pieces away. According to some mythologists, he owed this peculiar footgear to his mother Grid, who, knowing that he would be called upon to fight against fire on the last day, designed it as a protection against the fiery element, as her iron gauntlet had shielded Thor in his encounter with Geirrod.

In chapter 54, following Ragnarök and the rebirth of the world, it is told that Víðarr along with his brother Váli will have survived both the swelling of the sea and the fiery conflagration unleashed by Surtr, completely unharmed, and shall thereafter dwell on the field Iðavöllr, "where the city of Asgard had previously been".

According to Skáldskaparmál, Víðarr was one of the twelve presiding male gods seated in their thrones at a banquet for the visiting Ægir. At a point in dialogue between the skaldic god Bragi and Ægir, Snorri himself begins speaking of the myths in euhemeristic terms and states that the historical equivalent of Víðarr was the Trojan hero Aeneas who survived the Trojan War and went on to achieve "great deeds".

Later in the book, various kennings are given for Víðarr, including again the "silent As", "possessor of the iron shoe", "enemy and slayer of Fenrisulf", "the gods' avenging As", "father's homestead-inhabiting As", "son of Odin", and "brother of the Æsir". In the tale of the god Thor's visit to the hall of the jötunn Geirröd, Gríðr is stated as the mother of "Víðarr the Silent" who assists Thor in his journey. In chapter 33, after returning from Asgard and feasting with the gods, Ægir invites the gods to come to his hall in three months. Fourteen gods make the trip to attend the feast, including Víðarr. In chapter 75, Víðarr's name appears twice in a list of Æsir.

== Archaeological record ==
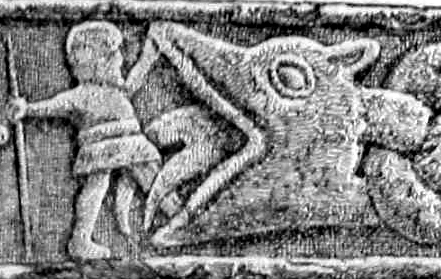
Detail of Gosforth Cross, artist unknown, 1913

The mid-11th century Gosforth Cross, located in Cumbria, England, has been described as depicting a combination of scenes from the Christian Judgement Day and the pagan Ragnarök. The cross features various figures depicted in Borre style, including a man with a spear facing a monstrous head, one of whose feet is thrust into the beast's forked tongue and on its lower jaw, while a hand is placed against its upper jaw, a scene interpreted as Víðarr fighting Fenrir. The depiction has also been theorized as a metaphor for Jesus' defeat of Satan.

== Theories ==
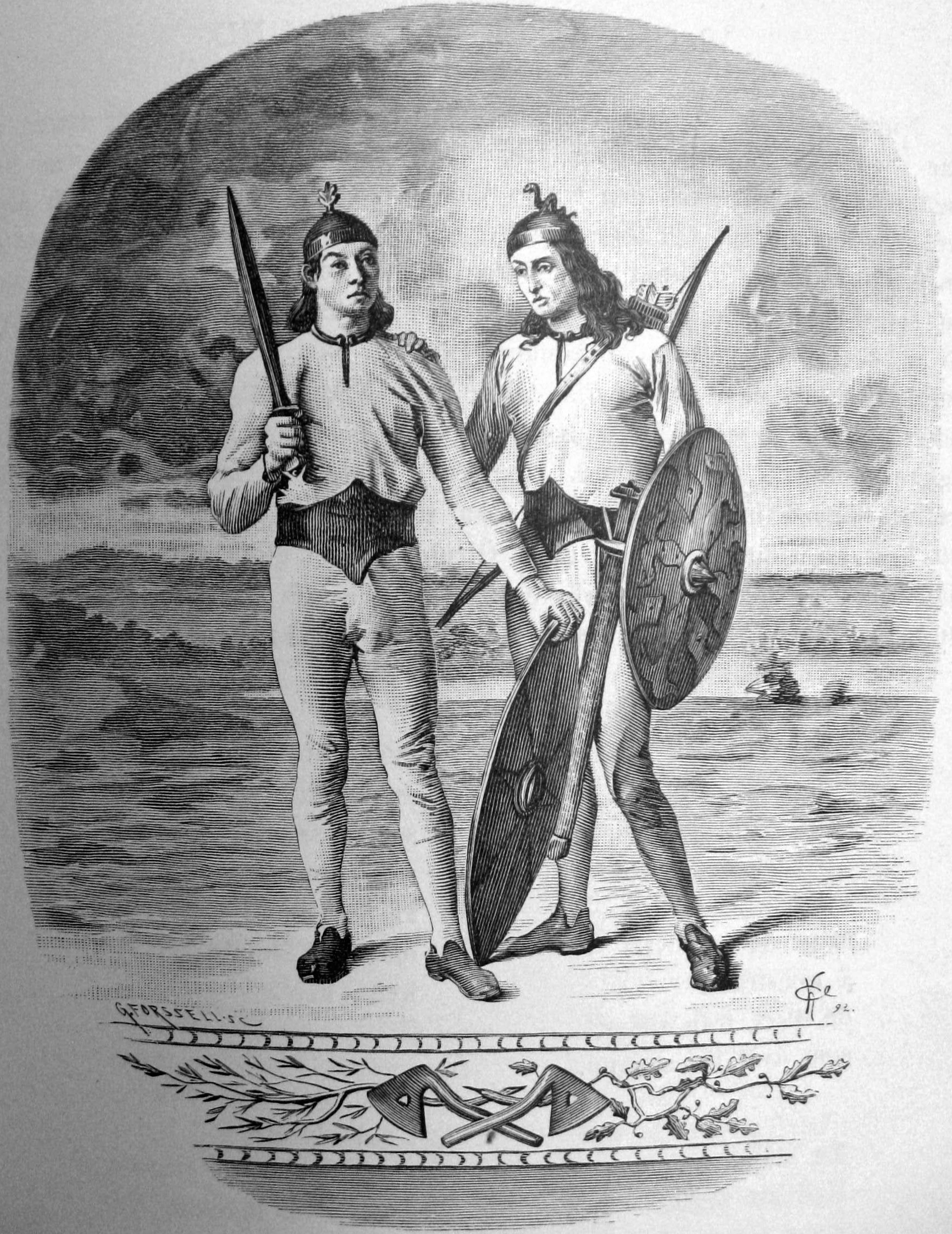
A depiction of Víðarr and Váli by Axel Kulle (1846–1908), 1892

Theories have been proposed that Víðarr's silence may derive from a ritual silence or other abstentions which often accompany acts of vengeance, as for example in Völuspá and Baldrs draumar when Váli, conceived for the sole purpose of avenging Baldr's death, abstains from washing his hands and combing his hair "until he brought Baldr's adversary to the funeral pyre". Parallels have been drawn between chapter 31 of Tacitus' 1st century CE work Germania where Tacitus describes that members of the Chatti, a Germanic tribe, may not shave or groom before having first slain an enemy.

=== Dumézil ===
Georges Dumézil theorized that Víðarr represents a cosmic figure from an archetype derived from the Proto-Indo-Europeans. Dumézil stated that he was aligned with both vertical space, due to his placement of his foot on the wolf's lower jaw and his hand on the wolf's upper jaw, and horizontal space, due to his wide step and strong shoe, and that, by killing the wolf, Víðarr keeps the wolf from destroying the cosmos, and the cosmos can thereafter be restored after the destruction resulting from Ragnarök.

Dumézil thus conceives of Víðarr as a spatial god. Dumézil substantiates his claim with the text of the Lokasenna, in which Víðarr, trying to mediate the dispute with Loki, urges the other Aesir to "grant Loki his space" at the feasting table. Dumézil argues that this play on Víðarr's spatiality would have been understood by an audience familiar with the god, an interpretation further warranted by his reading of the Lokasenna as being in significant part a book of puns and word plays about the different Aesir.

Dumézil also suggests that Víðarr's spatiality is seen in the Vishnu of the Vedic traditions, both etymologically (the Vi- root) and mythologically, citing the story of Bali and Vishnu. In this legend, Vishnu (in the form of Vamana) tricks the malevolent king Bali, who has secured dominion over the whole Earth, by making Bali promise to grant Vamana all the land he can cover in three paces. Vamana turns himself into a giant and strides across all of heaven and Earth, taking Bali's head and granting him immortality in lieu of taking the last pace.

Dumézil theorizes that these myths of Fenrir vs. Víðarr and Bali vs. Vishnu may have a common origin in an Indo-European god of spatiality, similar but distinct from the hypothetical framing or entry / exit god that spawned Janus and Heimdallr.
