= Eldir =

Servant of Ægir in Norse mythology

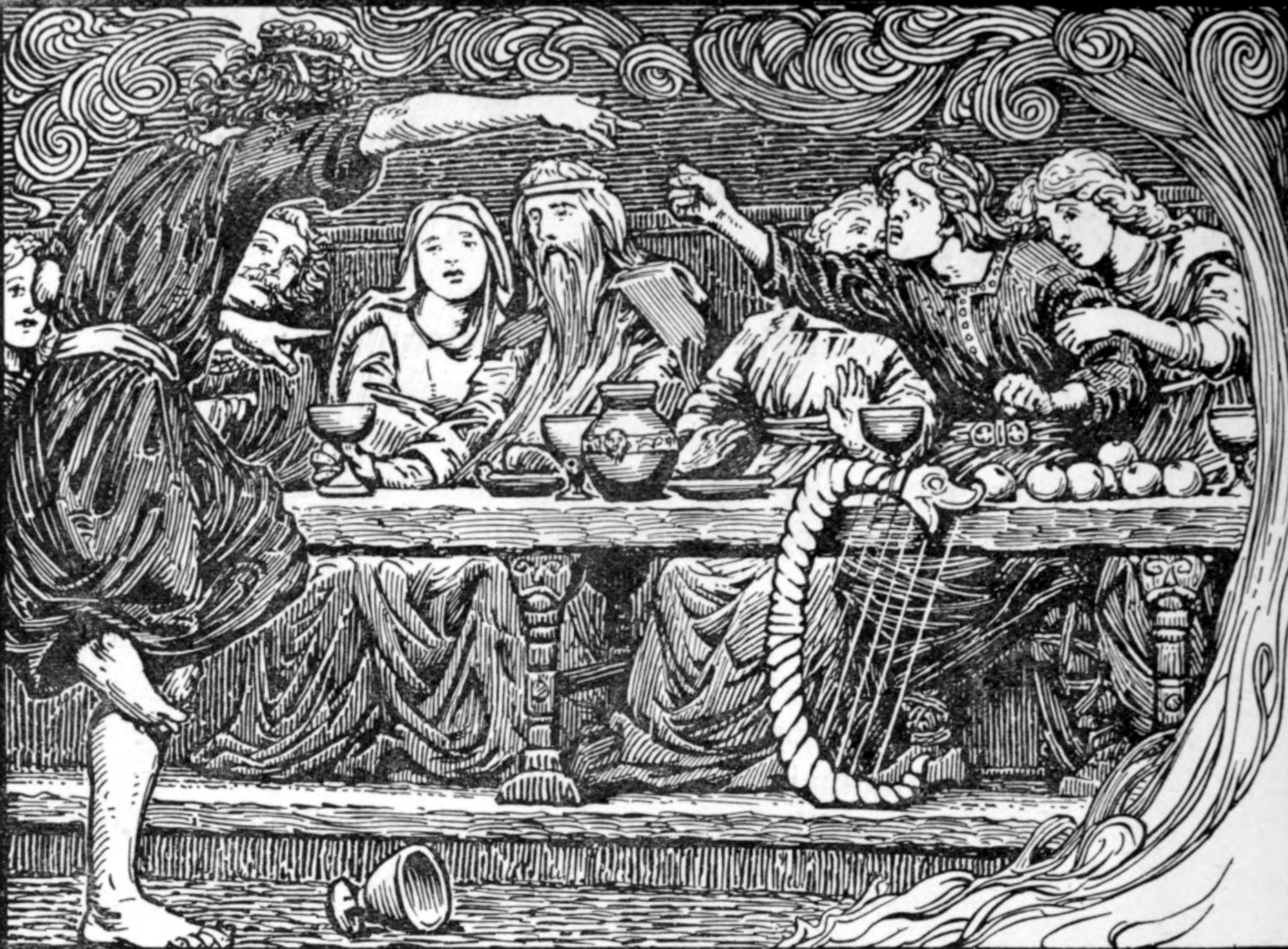
An illustration to Lokasenna.

Eldir (Old Norse: [ˈeldez̠], "fire-stoker") is a servant of Ægir in Norse mythology, and Loki's first verbal opponent in the poem Lokasenna (Loki's Flyting).

According to John Lindow, "Eldir fits the character type of the outer guardian, often a herdsman as in Skírnismál (11–16) with whom someone contends before entering a place for the main confrontation".

== Name ==
The Old Norse name Eldir has been translated as 'fire-stoker'.

== Attestations ==
The beginning of Lokasenna (Loki's Flyting) tells that people greatly praised Ægir's two servants, and that Loki killed one of them, Fimafeng, out of jealousy. The murderer is then chased by the gods from Ægir's hall, and upon his return, Loki confronts Eldir and asks him what the Æsir are discussing in the hall. Eldir replies that they are judging their weapons and prowess, and adds that no one is a friend of Loki’s in words. Loki then announces that he is about to enter the hall and blend mead with harmful power.

[Eldir:] You know, if you enter Ægir’s hall,
To gaze on that feast,
If slander and calumny you pour into the hall of the æsir,
On you they will dry it.

[Loki:] You know, Eldir, if we two alone should
Contend with harmful words,
Rich will I be in answers
If you speak much about it.

— Snorri Sturluson, Lokasenna, stanzas 4–5 (Trans. J. Lindow, 2002).
