= Loki =

Norse deity

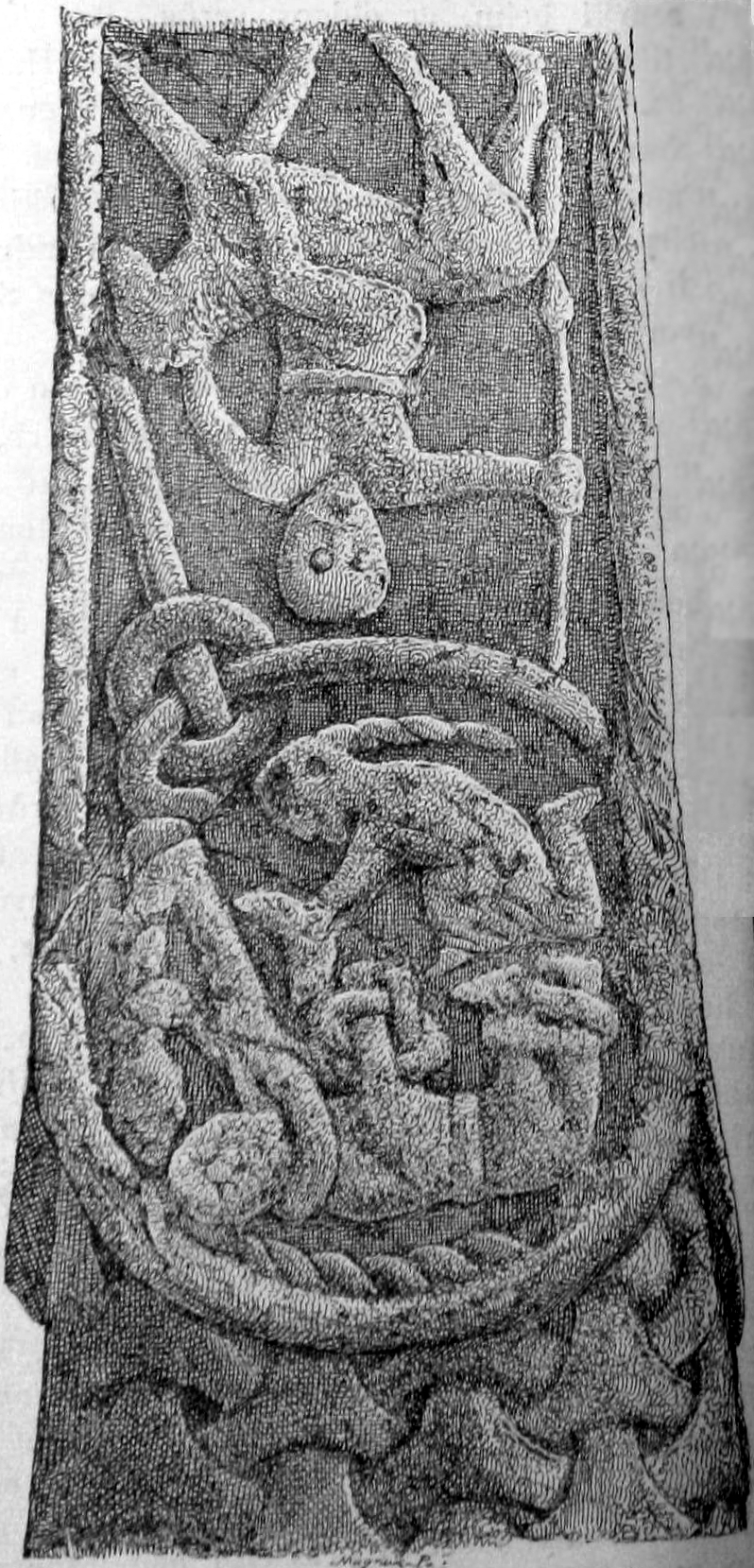
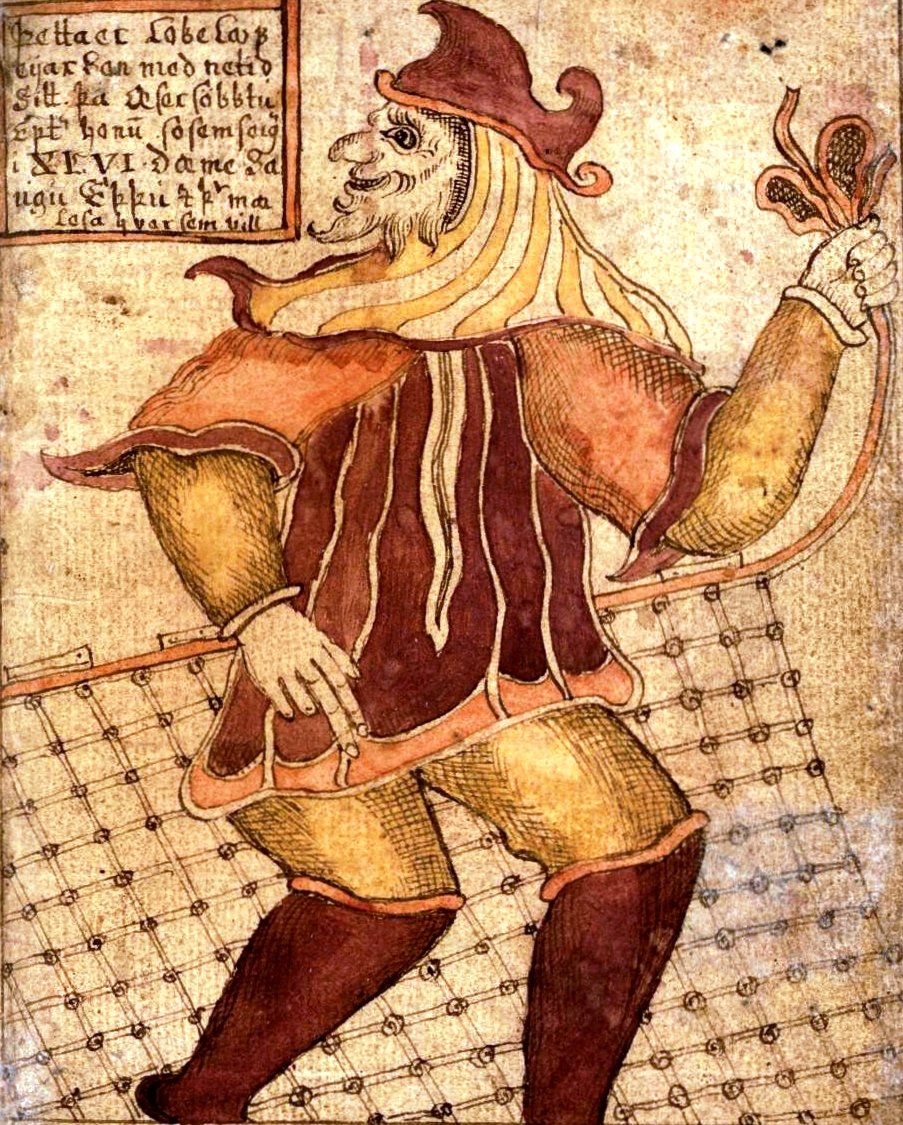
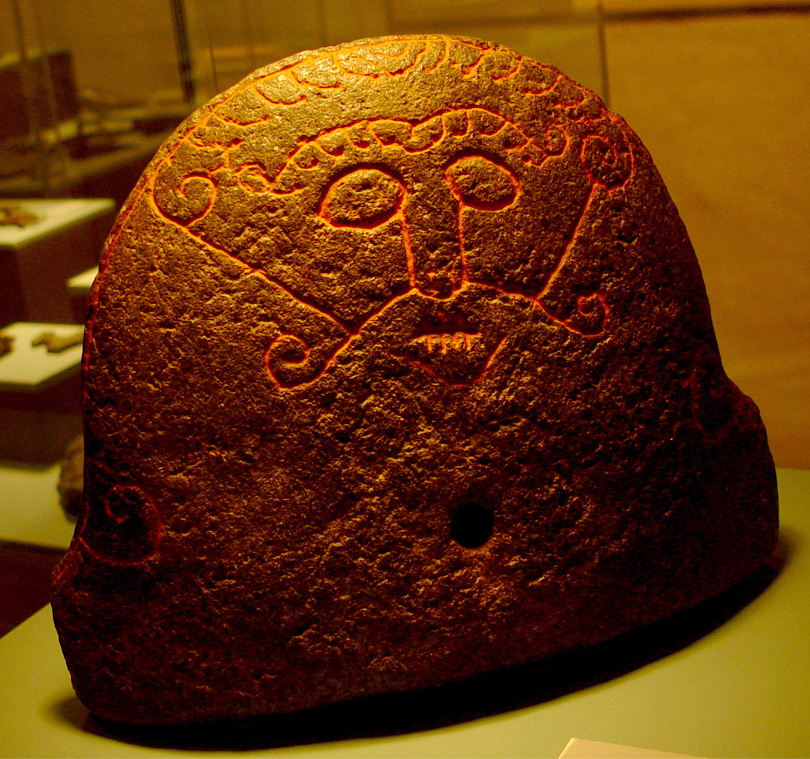
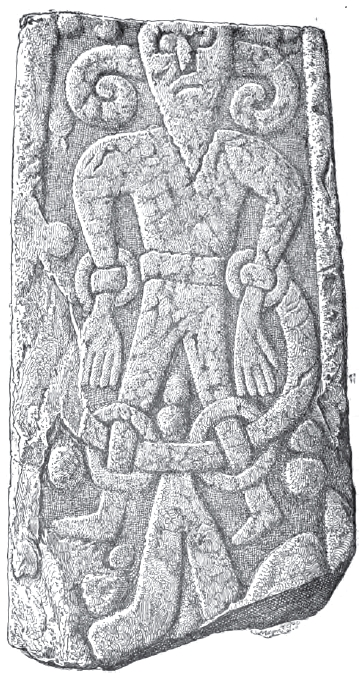
- Upper left: Detail from the Gosforth Cross, interpreted as Sigyn soothing the bound Loki
- Upper right: Loki with a fishing net (per Reginsmál), depicted in an 18th-century Icelandic manuscript (SÁM 66)
- Lower left: The Snaptun Stone may feature a depiction of Loki with sown mouth
- Lower right: The bound figure on the Kirkby Stephen Stone, thought to be Loki

Loki is a god in Norse mythology. Loki engineers the death of the beloved god Baldr and is bound by the gods and suffers from serpent venom. His wife Sigyn collects the venom in a bowl. However, she must empty the bowl when it is full and the venom that drips in the meantime causes Loki to writhe in pain, thereby causing earthquakes.

As part of the events of Ragnarök, Loki is foretold to eventually break free from his bonds and, among the forces of the jötnar, to go to battle with the gods, during which time he and his monstrous children play a key role in the destruction of humanity down to all but two humans. Loki has a particular enmity with the god Heimdallr, and they are foretold to kill one another during Ragnarök.

He is the son of Fárbauti (a jötunn) and Laufey (a goddess), and the brother of Helblindi and Býleistr. Loki is married to the goddess Sigyn and they have two sons, Narfi or Nari and Váli. By the jötunn Angrboða, Loki is the father of Hel, the wolf Fenrir and the world serpent Jörmungandr.

In the form of a mare, Loki was chased down and impregnated by the stallion Svaðilfari and gave birth to the eight-legged horse Sleipnir. Like other gods, Loki is a shape shifter. In addition to the shape of a mare, he appears in the form of a salmon, a fly, and possibly an elderly woman named Þökk (Old Norse 'thanks').

Loki is attested in the Poetic Edda, compiled in the 13th century from earlier traditional sources: the Prose Edda and Heimskringla, composed or compiled in the 13th century by Snorri Sturluson; the Norwegian Rune Poem, in the poetry of skalds, and in Scandinavian folklore.

Loki may be depicted with his mouth stitched closed on the Snaptun Stone, and bound on the Kirkby Stephen Stone and the Gosforth Cross.

Scholars have debated Loki's origins and role in Norse mythology, noting that he is unlikely to have received any kind of veneration but played a notable role in myth. Some have described him as a trickster god. Loki has been depicted in, or referenced in, a variety of media in modern popular culture.

== Etymology ==
The etymology of the name Loki has been extensively debated. The name has been associated with the Old Norse word logi ('flame') at times, but there does not seem to be a sound linguistic basis for this. Rather, the later Scandinavian variants of the name (such as Danish: Loke; Faroese: Lokki; Icelandic: Loki; Norwegian: Loke, Lokke, Swedish: Locke, Loke, Luki, Luku) point to an origin in the Germanic root *luk-, which denoted things to do with loops (like knots, hooks, closed-off rooms, and locks). This corresponds with usages such as the Swedish lockanät and Faroese lokkanet ('cobweb', literally 'Lokke's web'), as well as modern Swedish lockespindlar ("Locke-spiders"). Some Eastern Swedish traditions referring to the same figure use forms in n- like Nokk(e), but this corresponds to the *luk- etymology insofar, as those dialects consistently used a different root, Germanic *hnuk-, in contexts where western varieties used *luk-: "nokke corresponds to nøkkel" ('key' in Eastern Scandinavian) "as loki~lokke to lykil" ('key' in Western Scandinavian).

It has been suggested that this association with closing could point to Loki's apocalyptic role at Ragnarök. According to Eldar Heide, "there is quite a bit of evidence that Loki in premodern society was thought to be the causer of knots/tangles/loops, or himself a knot/tangle/loop. Hence, it is natural that Loki is the inventor of the fishnet, which consists of loops and knots, and that the word loki (lokke, lokki, loke, luki) is a term for makers of cobwebs: spiders and the like." Though not prominent in the oldest sources, this identity as a "tangler" may be the etymological meaning of Loki's name.

=== Bynames ===
In various poems from the Poetic Edda (stanza 2 of Lokasenna, stanza 41 of Hyndluljóð, and stanza 26 of Fjölsvinnsmál), and sections of the Prose Edda (chapter 32 of Gylfaginning, stanza 8 of Haustlöng, and stanza 1 of Þórsdrápa) Loki is alternatively referred to as Loptr, which is generally considered derived from Old Norse lopt meaning "air", and therefore points to an association with the air.

The name Hveðrungr (Old Norse '?roarer') is also used in reference to Loki, occurring in names for Hel (such as in Ynglingatal, where she is called hveðrungs mær) and in reference to Fenrir (as in Völuspa).

== Attestations ==
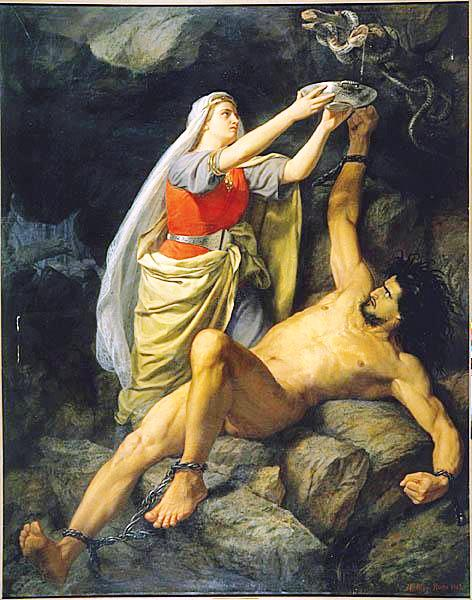
Loki and Sigyn (1863) by Mårten Eskil Winge

=== Poetic Edda ===
In the Poetic Edda, Loki appears (or is referenced) in the poems Völuspá, Lokasenna, Þrymskviða, Reginsmál, Baldrs draumar, and Hyndluljóð.

==== Völuspá ====
In stanza 35 of the Poetic Edda poem Völuspá, a völva tells Odin that, among many other things, she sees Sigyn sitting very unhappily with her bound husband, Loki, under a "grove of hot springs". In stanza 51, during the events of Ragnarök, Loki appears free from his bonds and is referred to as the "brother of Býleistr" (here transcribed as Byleist):

A ship journeys from the east, Muspell's people are coming,
over the waves, and Loki steers
There are the monstrous brood with all the raveners,
The brother of Byleist is in company with them.

In stanza 54, after consuming Odin and being killed by Odin's son Víðarr, Fenrir is described as "Loki's kinsman".

==== Lokasenna ====
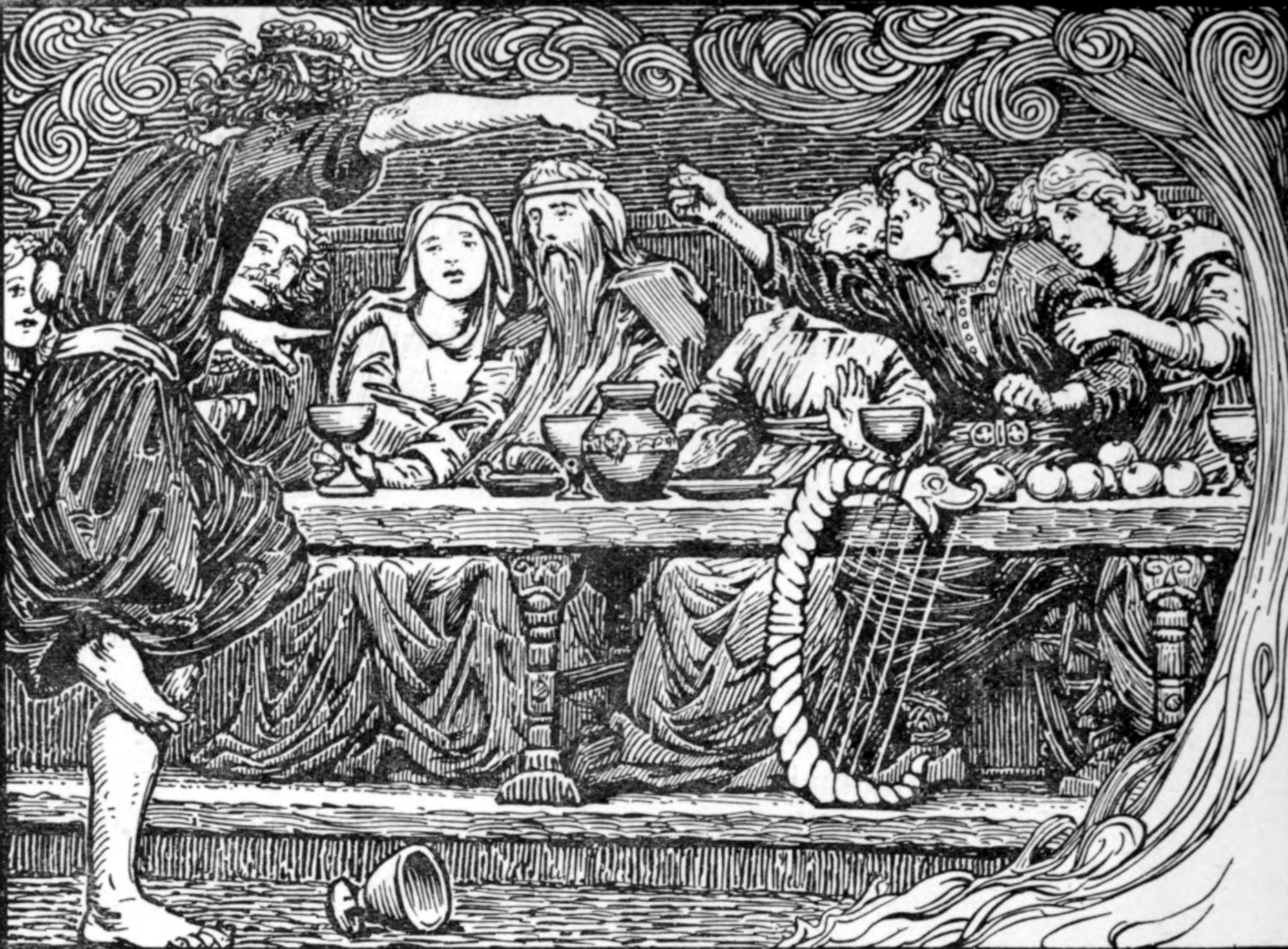
Loki taunts Bragi (1908) by W. G. Collingwood

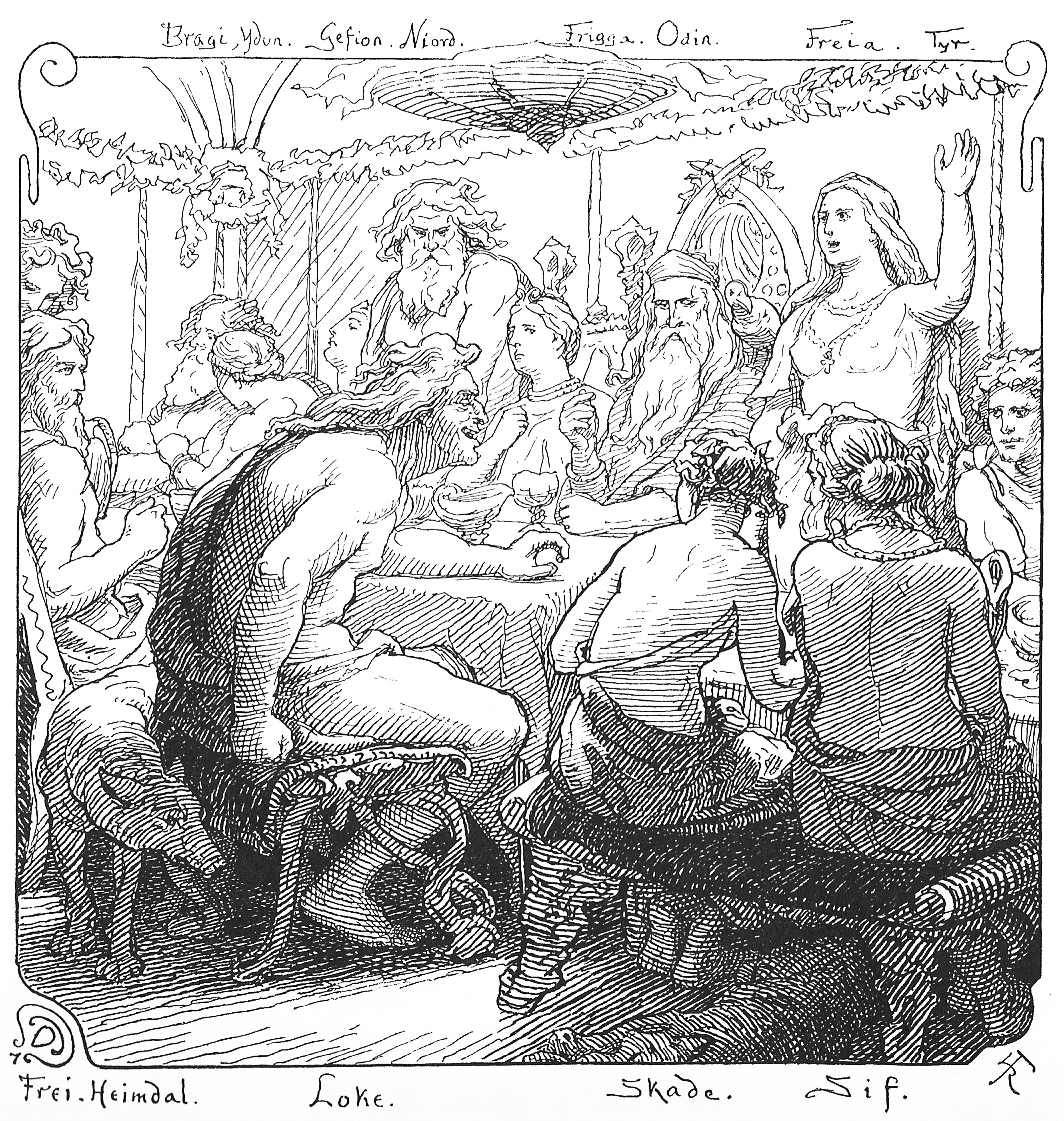
A depiction of Lokasenna (1895) by Lorenz Frølich

The poem Lokasenna (Old Norse "Loki's Flyting") centers around Loki flyting with other gods; Loki puts forth two stanzas of insults while the receiving figure responds with a single stanza, and then another figure chimes in. The poem begins with a prose introduction detailing that Ægir, a figure associated with the sea, is hosting a feast in his hall for a number of the gods and elves. There, the gods praise Ægir's servers Fimafeng and Eldir. Loki "could not bear to hear that", and kills the servant Fimafeng. In response, the gods grab their shields, shrieking at Loki, and chase him out of the hall and to the woods. The gods then return to the hall, and continue drinking.

===== Entrance and rejection =====
Loki comes out of the woods and meets Eldir outside of the hall. Loki greets Eldir (and the poem itself begins) with a demand that Eldir tell him what the gods are discussing over their ale inside the hall. Eldir responds that they discuss their "weapons and their prowess in war" and yet no one there has anything friendly to say about Loki. Loki says that he will go into the feast, and that, before the end of the feast, he will induce quarrelling among the gods, and "mix their mead with malice". Eldir responds that "if shouting and fighting you pour out on" to the gods, "they'll wipe it off on you". Loki then enters the hall, and everyone there falls silent upon noticing him.

===== Re-entrance and insults =====
Breaking the silence, Loki says that, thirsty, he had come to these halls from a long way away to ask the gods for a drink of "the famous mead". Calling the gods arrogant, Loki asks why they are unable to speak, and demands that they assign him a seat and a place for him at the feast, or tell him to leave. The skaldic god Bragi is the first to respond to Loki by telling him that Loki will not have a seat and place assigned to him by the gods at the feast, for the gods know what men they should invite. Loki does not respond to Bragi directly, but instead directs his attention to Odin, and states:

Do you remember, Odin, when in bygone days
we mixed our blood together?
You said you would never drink ale
unless it were brought to both of us.

Odin then asks his silent son Víðarr to stand up, so that Loki (here referred to as the "wolf's father") may sit at the feast, and so that he may not speak words of blame to the gods in Ægir's hall. Víðarr stands and pours a drink for Loki. Prior to drinking, Loki declaims a toast to the gods, with a specific exception for Bragi. Bragi responds that he will give a horse, sword, and ring from his possessions so that he does not repay the gods "with hatred". Loki responds that Bragi will always be short of all of these things, accusing him of being "wary of war" and "shy of shooting". Bragi responds that, were they outside of Ægir's hall, Bragi would be holding Loki's head as a reward for his lies. Loki replies that Bragi is brave when seated, calling him a "bench-ornament", and that Bragi would run away when troubled by an angry, spirited man.

The goddess Iðunn interrupts, asking Bragi, as a service to his relatives and adopted relatives, not to say words of blame to Loki in Ægir's hall. Loki tells Iðunn to be silent, calling her the most "man-crazed" of all women, and saying that she placed her washed, bright arms around her brother's slayer. Iðunn says that she will not say words of blame in Ægir's hall, and affirms that she quietened Bragi, who was made talkative by beer, and that she does not want the two of them to fight. The goddess Gefjun asks why the two gods must fight, saying that Loki knows that he is joking, and that "all living things love him". Loki responds to Gefjun by stating that Gefjun's heart was once seduced by a "white boy" who gave her a jewel, and who Gefjun laid her thigh over.

Odin says that Loki must be insane to make Gefjun his enemy, as her wisdom about the fates of men may equal Odin's own. Loki says that Odin does a poor job in handing out honor in war to men, and that he's often given victory to the faint-hearted. Odin responds that even if this is true, Loki (in a story otherwise unattested) once spent eight winters beneath the earth as a woman milking cows, and during this time bore children. Odin declares this perverse. Loki counters that Odin once practiced seiðr (a type of sorcery) on the island of Samsey (now Samsø, Denmark), and, appearing as a wizard, traveled among mankind, which Loki condemns as perverse.

Frigg, a major deity who is married to Odin, says that what Loki and Odin did in the ancient past should not be spoken of in front of others, and that ancient matters should always remain hidden. Loki brings up that Frigg is the daughter of Fjörgyn, a personification of the earth, and that she had once taken Odin's brothers Vili and Vé into her embrace. Frigg responds that if there was a boy like her now-deceased son Baldr in the hall, Loki would not be able to escape from the wrath of the gods. Loki reminds Frigg that he is responsible for the death of her son Baldr.

The goddess Freyja declares that Loki must be mad, stating that Frigg knows all fate, yet she does not speak it. Loki claims each of the gods and elves that are present have been Freyja's lover. Freyja replies that Loki is lying, that he just wants to "yelp about wicked things" that gods and goddesses are furious with him, and that he will go home thwarted. In response, Loki calls Freyja a malicious witch, and claims that Freyja was once astride her brother Freyr, when all of the other laughing gods surprised her and Freyja then farted. This scenario is otherwise unattested. Njörðr (Freyja and Freyr's father) says that it is harmless for a woman to have a lover or "someone else" beside her husband, and that what is surprising is a "pervert god coming here who has borne children".

Loki tells Njörðr to be silent, recalling Njörðr's status as once having been a hostage from the Vanir to the Æsir during the Æsir-Vanir War, that the "daughters of Hymir" once used Njörðr "as a pisspot", urinating in his mouth (an otherwise unattested comment). Njörðr responds that this was his reward when he was sent as a hostage to the Æsir, and that he fathered his son (Freyr), whom no one hates, and is considered a prince of the Æsir. Loki tells Njörðr to maintain his moderation, and that he will not keep it secret any longer that Njörðr fathered this son with his sister (unnamed), although one would expect him to be worse than he turned out.

The god Tyr defends Freyr, to which Loki replies that Tyr should be silent, for Tyr cannot "deal straight with people", and points out that it was Loki's son, the wolf Fenrir, who tore Tyr's hand off. (According to the prose introduction to the poem Tyr is now one-handed from having his arm bitten off by Loki's son Fenrir while Fenrir was bound.) Tyr responds that while he may have lost a hand, Loki has lost the wolf, and trouble has come to them both. Further, that Fenrir must now wait in shackles until the onset of Ragnarök. Loki tells Tyr to be silent a second time, and states that Tyr's wife (otherwise unattested) had a son by Loki, and that Tyr never received any compensation for this "injury", further calling him a "wretch".

Freyr himself interrupts at this point, and says that he sees a wolf lying before a river mouth, and that, unless Loki is immediately silent, like the wolf, Loki shall also be bound until Ragnarök. Loki retorts that Freyr purchased his consort Gerðr with gold, having given away his sword, which he will lack at Ragnarök. Byggvir (referred to in the prose introduction to the poem as a servant of Freyr) says that if he had as noble a lineage and as an honorable a seat as Freyr, he would grind down Loki, and make all of his limbs lame. Loki refers to Byggvir in terms of a dog, and says that Byggvir is always found at Freyr's ears, or twittering beneath a grindstone. Byggvir says that he is proud to be here by all the gods and men, and that he is said to be speedy. Loki tells him to be silent, that Byggvir does not know how to apportion food among men, and that he hides among the straw and dais when men go to battle.

The god Heimdallr says that Loki is drunk and witless, and asks Loki why he will not stop speaking. Loki tells Heimdallr to be silent, that he was fated a "hateful life", that Heimdallr must always have a muddy back, and serve as watchman of the gods. The goddess Skaði says that while Loki now appears light-hearted and "playing" with his "tail-wagging", he will soon be bound with his ice-cold son's guts on a sharp rock by the gods. Loki says that, even if this is his fate, that he was "first and foremost" with the other gods at the killing of Skaði's father, Þjazi. Skaði says that, with these events in mind, "baneful advice" will always come from her "sanctuaries and plains" to Loki. Loki says that Skaði was once gentler in speech to him (referring to himself as the "son of Laufey") when Skaði once invited him to her bed (an event that is unattested elsewhere), and that such events must be mentioned if they are to recall "shameful deeds".

Sif goes forth and pours Loki a glass of mead into a crystal cup in a prose narrative. Continuing the poem, Sif welcomes Loki and invites him to take a crystal cup filled with ancient mead, and says that among the children of the Æsir, she is singularly blameless. Loki "takes the horn", drinks it, and says that she would be, if it were so, and states that Sif and Loki had been lovers, despite her marriage to Thor (an affair that is otherwise unattested). Beyla (referred to in the prose introduction to the poem as a servant of Freyr) says that all of the mountains are shaking, that she thinks Thor must be on his way home, and when Thor arrives he will bring peace to those that quarrel there. Loki tells Beyla to be silent, that she is "much imbued with malice", that no worse woman has ever been among the "Æsir's children", and calling her a bad "serving-wench".

===== The arrival of Thor and the bondage of Loki =====
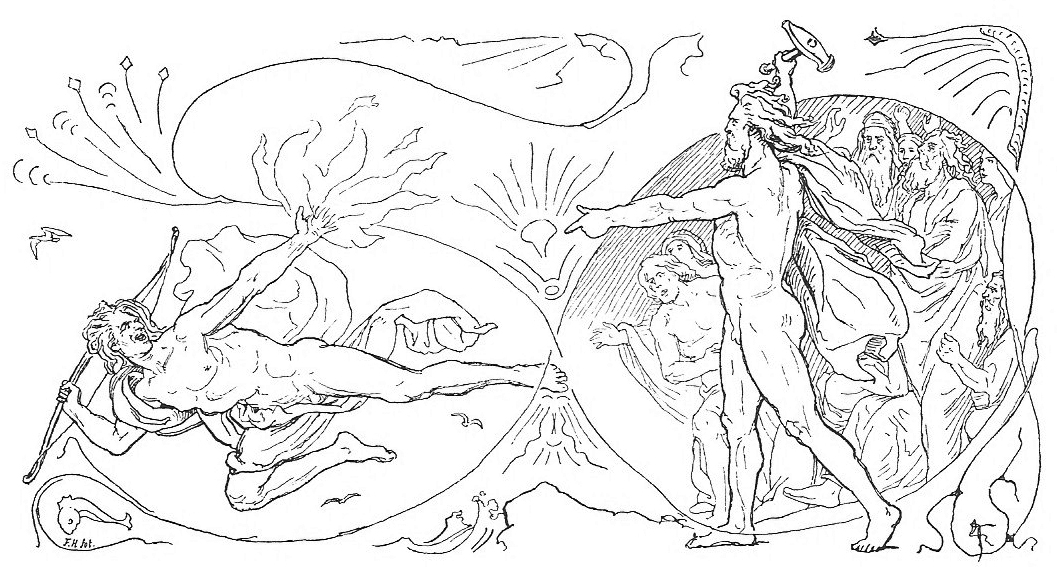
Loki threatens the Æsir with fire (1895) by Lorenz Frølich

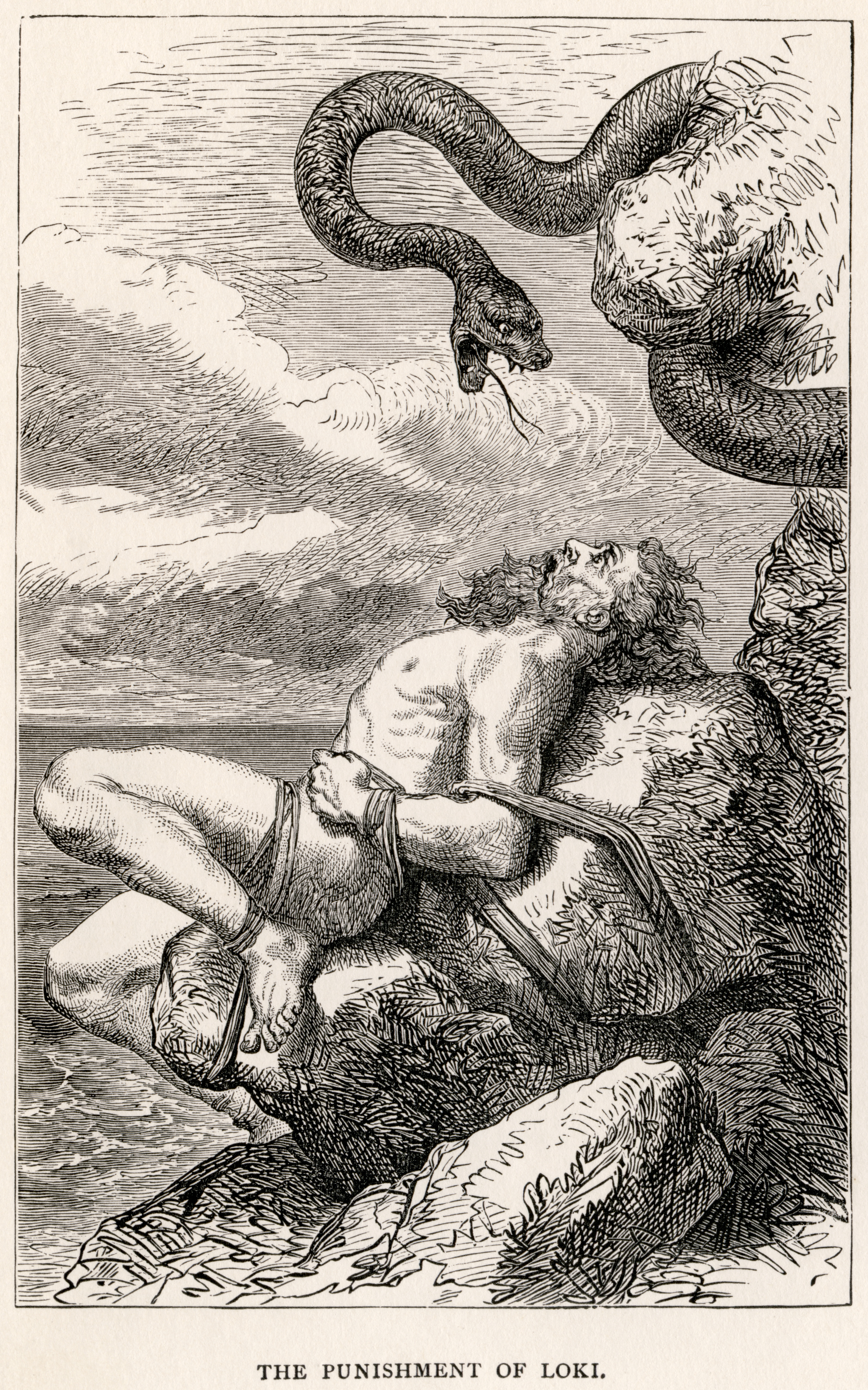
The Punishment of Loki by Louis Huard

Thor arrives, and tells Loki to be silent, referring to him as an "evil creature", stating that with his hammer Mjöllnir he will silence Loki by hammering his head from his shoulders. Acknowledging that Thor has arrived, Loki asks Thor why he is raging, and says that Thor will not be so bold to fight against the wolf when he swallows Odin at Ragnarök. Thor again tells Loki to be silent, and threatens him with Mjöllnir, adding that he will throw Loki "up on the roads to the east", and thereafter no one will be able to see Loki. Loki states that Thor should never brag of his journeys to the east, claiming that there Thor crouched cowering in the thumb of a glove, mockingly referring to him as a "hero", and adding that such behaviour was unlike Thor. Thor responds by telling Loki to be silent, threatening him with Mjöllnir, and adding that every one of Loki's bones will be broken with it. Loki says he intends to live for a long while yet despite Thor's threats, and taunts Thor about an encounter Thor once had with the Skrýmir (Útgarða-Loki in disguise). Thor again commands Loki to be silent, threatens Loki with Mjöllnir, and says he will send Loki to Hel, below the gates of Nágrind.

In response to Thor, Loki says that he "spoke before the Æsir", and "before the sons of the Æsir" what his "spirit urged" him to say, yet before Thor alone he will leave, as he knows that Thor does strike. Loki ends the poetic verses of Lokasenna with a final stanza:

Ale you brewed, Ægir, and you will never again hold a feast;
all your possessions which are here inside—
may flame play over them,
and may your back be burnt!

Following this final stanza a prose section details that after Loki left the hall, he disguised himself as a salmon and hid in the waterfall of Franangrsfors, where the Æsir caught him. The narrative continues that Loki was bound with the entrails of his son Nari, and his son Narfi changed into a wolf. Skaði fastened a venomous snake over Loki's face, and from it poison dripped. Sigyn, his spouse, sat with him holding a basin beneath the dripping venom, yet when the basin became full, she carried the poison away; and during this time the poison dripped on to Loki, causing him to writhe with such violence that all of the earth shook from the force, resulting in what are now known as earthquakes.

==== Þrymskviða ====
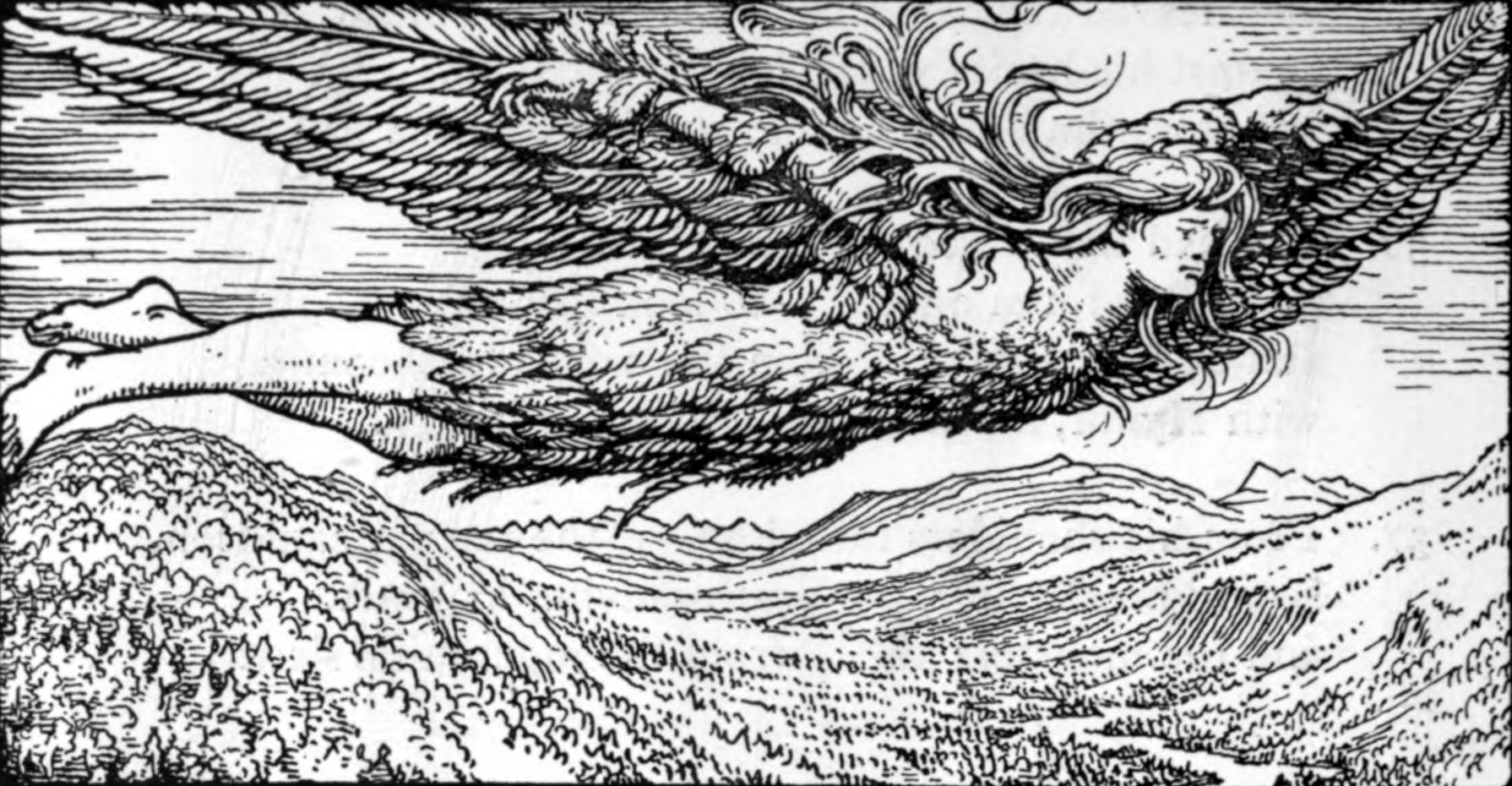
Loki's flight to Jötunheim (1908) by W. G. Collingwood

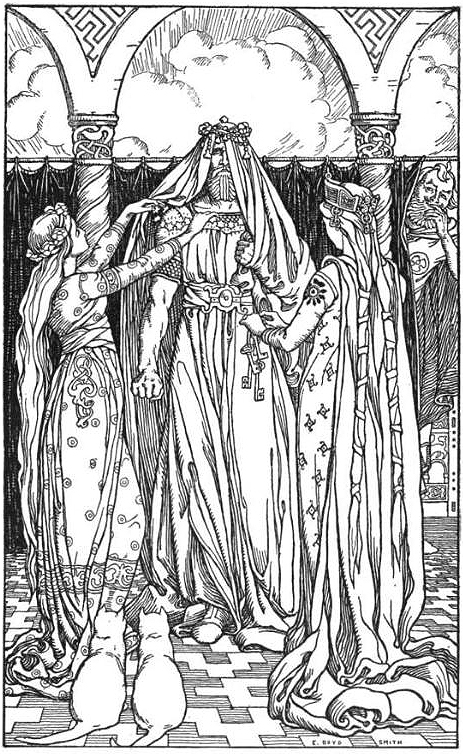
Ah, what a lovely maid it is! (1902) by Elmer Boyd Smith

In the poem Þrymskviða, Thor wakes and finds that his powerful hammer, Mjöllnir, is missing. Thor turns to Loki first, and tells him that nobody knows that the hammer has been stolen. The two then go to the court of the goddess Freyja, and Thor asks her if he may borrow her feather cloak so that he may attempt to find Mjöllnir. Freyja agrees, saying she would lend it even if it were made of silver and gold, and Loki flies off, the feather cloak whistling.

In Jötunheimr, the jötunn Þrymr sits on a burial mound, plaiting golden collars for his female dogs, and trimming the manes of his horses. Þrymr sees Loki, and asks what could be amiss among the Æsir and the Elves; why is Loki alone in the Jötunheimr? Loki responds that he has bad news for both the elves and the Æsir: that Thor's hammer, Mjöllnir, is gone. Þrymr says that he has hidden Mjöllnir eight leagues beneath the earth, from which it will be retrieved if Freyja is brought to marry him. Loki flies off, the feather cloak whistling, away from Jötunheimr and back to the court of the gods.

Thor asks Loki if his efforts were successful, and that Loki should tell him while he is still in the air as "tales often escape a sitting man, and the man lying down often barks out lies". Loki states that it was indeed an effort, and also a success, for he has discovered that Þrymr has the hammer, but that it cannot be retrieved unless Freyja is brought to marry Þrymr. The two return to Freyja, and tell her to dress herself in a bridal head dress, as they will drive her to Jötunheimr. Freyja, indignant and angry, goes into a rage, causing all of the halls of the Æsir to tremble in her anger, and her necklace, the famed Brísingamen, falls from her. Freyja pointedly refuses.

As a result, the gods and goddesses meet and hold a thing to discuss and debate the matter. At the thing, the god Heimdallr puts forth the suggestion that, in place of Freyja, Thor should be dressed as the bride, complete with jewels, women's clothing down to his knees, a bridal head-dress, and the necklace Brísingamen. Thor rejects the idea, and Loki (here described as "son of Laufey") interjects that this will be the only way to get back Mjöllnir, and points out that without Mjöllnir, the jötnar will be able to invade and settle in Asgard. The gods dress Thor as a bride, and Loki states that he will go with Thor as his maid, and that the two shall drive to Jötunheimr together.

After riding together in Thor's goat-driven chariot, the two, disguised, arrive in Jötunheimr. Þrymr commands the jötnar in his hall to spread straw on the benches, for Freyja has arrived to marry him. Þrymr recounts his treasured animals and objects, stating that Freyja was all that he was missing in his wealth.

Early in the evening, the disguised Loki and Thor meet with Þrymr and the assembled jötnar. Thor eats and drinks ferociously, consuming entire animals and three casks of mead. Þrymr finds the behaviour at odds with his impression of Freyja, and Loki, sitting before Þrymr and appearing as a "very shrewd maid", makes the excuse that "Freyja's" behaviour is due to her having not consumed anything for eight entire days before arriving due to her eagerness to arrive. Þrymr then lifts "Freyja's" veil and wants to kiss "her" until catching the terrifying eyes staring back at him, seemingly burning with fire. Loki states that this is because "Freyja" had not slept for eight nights in her eagerness.

The "wretched sister" of the jötnar appears, asks for a bridal gift from "Freyja", and the jötnar bring out Mjöllnir to "sanctify the bride", to lay it on her lap, and marry the two by "the hand" of the goddess Vár. Thor laughs internally when he sees the hammer, takes hold of it, strikes Þrymr, beats all of the jötnar, and kills the "older sister" of the jötnar.

==== Reginsmál ====
Loki appears in both prose and the first six stanzas of the poem Reginsmál. The prose introduction to Reginsmál details that, while the hero Sigurd was being fostered by Regin, son of Hreidmar, Regin tells him that once the gods Odin, Hœnir, and Loki went to Andvara-falls, which contained many fish. Regin, a dwarf, had two brothers; Andvari, who gained food by spending time in the Andvara-falls in the form of a pike, and Ótr, who would often go to the Andvara-falls in the form of an otter.

While the three gods are at the falls, Ótr (in the form of an otter) catches a salmon and eats it on a river bank, his eyes shut, when Loki hits and kills him with a stone. The gods think that this is great, and flay the skin from the otter to make a bag. That night, the three gods stay with Hreidmar (the father of Regin, Andvari, and the now-dead Ótr) and show him their catches, including the skin of the otter. Upon seeing the skin, Regin and Hreidmar "seized them and made them ransom their lives" in exchange for filling the otterskin bag the gods had made with gold and covering the exterior of the bag with red gold.

Loki is sent to retrieve the gold, and Loki goes to the goddess Rán, borrows her net, and then goes back to the Andvara-falls. At the falls, Loki spreads his net before Andvari (who is in the form of a pike), which Andvari jumps into. The stanzas of the poem then begin: Loki mocks Andvari, and tells him that he can save his head by telling Loki where his gold is. Andvari gives some background information about himself, including that he was cursed by a "norn of misfortune" in his "early days". Loki responds by asking Andvari "what requital" does mankind get if "they wound each other with words". Andvari responds that lying men receive a "terrible requital": having to wade in the river Vadgelmir, and that their suffering will be long.

Loki looks over the gold that Andvari possesses, and after Andvari hands over all of his gold, Andvari holds on to but a single ring; the ring Andvarinaut, which Loki also takes. Andvari, now in the form of a dwarf, goes into a rock, and tells Loki that the gold will result in the death of two brothers, will cause strife between eight princes, and will be useless to everyone.

Loki returns, and the three gods give Hreidmar the money from the gold hoard and flatten out the otter skin, stretch out its legs, and heap gold atop it, covering it. Hreidmar looks it over, and notices a single hair that has not been covered. Hreidmar demands that it be covered as well. Odin puts forth the ring Andvarinaut, covering the single hair.

Loki states that they have now handed over the gold, and that gold is cursed as Andvari is, and that it will be the death of Hreidmar and Regin both. Hreidmar responds that if he had known this before, he would have taken their lives, yet that he believes those are not yet born whom the curse is intended for, and that he does not believe him. Further, with the hoard, he will have red gold for the rest of his life. Hreidmar tells them to leave, and the poem continues without further mention of Loki.

==== Baldrs draumar ====
In Baldr draumar, Odin has awoken a deceased völva in Hel, and questions her repeatedly about his son Baldr's bad dreams. Loki is mentioned in stanza 14, the final stanza of the poem, where the völva tells Odin to ride home, to be proud of himself, and that no one else will come visit until "Loki is loose, escaped from his bonds" and the onset of Ragnarök.

==== Hyndluljóð ====
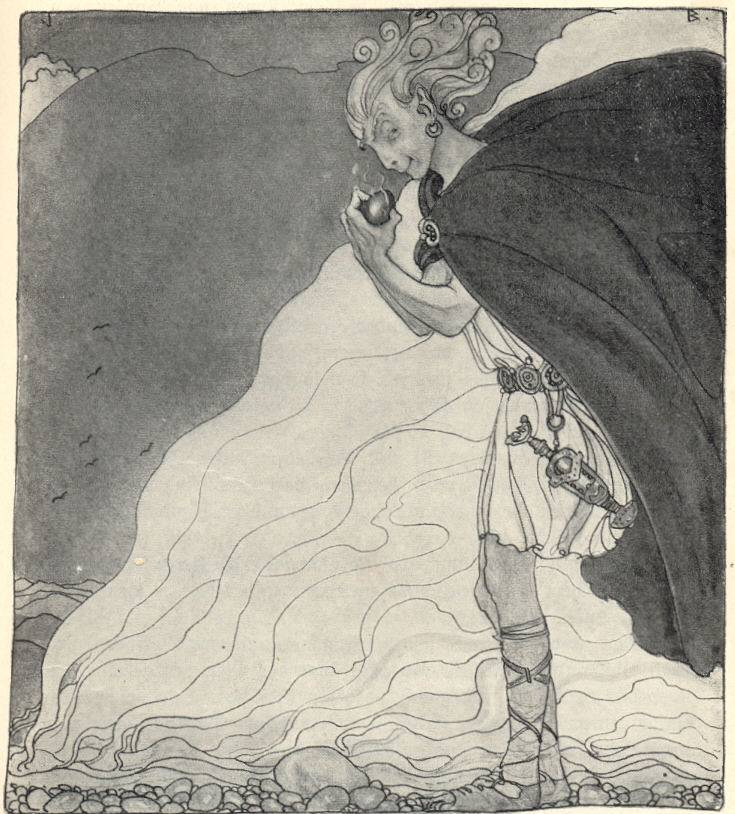
Loki consumes a roasted heart in a painting (1911) by John Bauer.

Loki is referenced in two stanzas in Völuspá hin skamma, found within the poem Hyndluljóð. The first stanza notes that Loki produced "the wolf" with the jötunn Angrboða, that Loki himself gave birth to the horse Sleipnir by the stallion Svaðilfari, and that Loki (referred to as the "brother of Býleistr") thirdly gave birth to "the worst of all marvels". This stanza is followed by:

Loki ate some of the heart, the thought-stone of a woman,
roasted on a linden-wood fire, he found it half-cooked;
Lopt was impregnated by a wicked woman,
from whom every ogress on earth is descended.

In the second of the two stanzas, Loki is referred to as Lopt. Loki's consumption of a woman's heart is otherwise unattested.

==== Fjölsvinnsmál ====
In the poem Fjölsvinnsmál, a stanza mentions Loki (as Lopt) in association with runes. In the poem, Fjölsviðr describes to the hero Svipdagr that Sinmara keeps the weapon Lævateinn within a chest, locked with nine strong locks (due to significant translation differences, two translations of the stanza are provided here):

Fjolsvith spake:

"Lævatein is there, that Lopt with runes
Once made by the doors of death;
In Lægjarn's chest by Sinmora lies it,

And nine locks fasten it firm."
Fiolsvith.

Hævatein the twig is named, and Lopt plucked it,
down by the gate of Death.
In an iron chest it lies with Sinmœra,

and is with nine strong locks secured.

=== Prose Edda ===
==== Gylfaginning ====
The Prose Edda book Gylfaginning tells various myths featuring Loki, including Loki's role in the birth of the horse Sleipnir and Loki's contest with Logi, fire personified.

===== High's introduction =====
Loki first appears in the Prose Edda in chapter 20 of the book Gylfaginning, where he is referred to as the "ás called Loki" while the enthroned figure of Third explains to "Gangleri" (King Gylfi in disguise) the goddess Frigg's prophetic abilities while citing a stanza of Lokasenna.

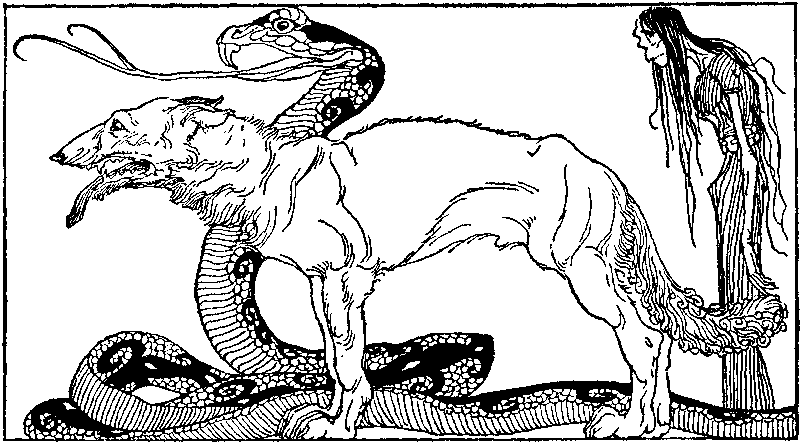
"The children of Loki" (1920) by Willy Pogany

Loki is more formally introduced by High in chapter 34, where he is "reckoned among the Æsir", and High states that Loki is called by some "the Æsir's calumniator", "originator of deceits", and "the disgrace of all gods and men". High says that Loki's alternative name is Lopt, that he is the son of the male jötunn Fárbauti, his mother is "Laufey or Nál", and his brothers are Helblindi and Býleistr. High describes Loki as "pleasing and handsome" in appearance, malicious in character, "very capricious in behaviour", and as possessing "to a greater degree than others" learned cunning, and "tricks for every purpose", often getting the Æsir into trouble, and then getting them out of it with his trickery. Sigyn is introduced as being married to Loki, and they have a son named "Nari or Narfi". Otherwise, Loki had three children with the female jötunn Angrboða from Jötunheimr; the wolf Fenrir, the serpent Jörmungandr, and the female being Hel. The gods realized that these three children were being raised in Jötunheimr, and expected trouble from them partially due to the nature of Angrboða, but worse yet Loki. In chapter 35, Gangleri comments that Loki produced a "pretty terrible"—yet important—family.

===== Loki, Svaðilfari, and Sleipnir =====
In chapter 42, High tells a story set "right at the beginning of the gods' settlement, when the gods at established Midgard and built Val-Hall". The story is about an unnamed builder who has offered to build a fortification for the gods that will keep out invaders in exchange for the goddess Freyja, the sun, and the moon. After some debate, the gods agree to these conditions, but place a number of restrictions on the builder, including that he must complete the work within three seasons without the help of any man. The builder makes a single request; that he may have help from his stallion Svaðilfari, and due to Loki's influence, this is allowed. The stallion Svaðilfari performs twice the deeds of strength as the builder, and hauls enormous rocks—to the surprise of the gods. The builder, with Svaðilfari, makes fast progress on the wall, and three days before the deadline of summer, the builder is nearly at the entrance to the fortification. The gods convene, and figure out who is responsible, resulting in a unanimous agreement that, along with most trouble, Loki is to blame (here referred to as Loki Laufeyjarson—his surname derived from his mother's name, Laufey).

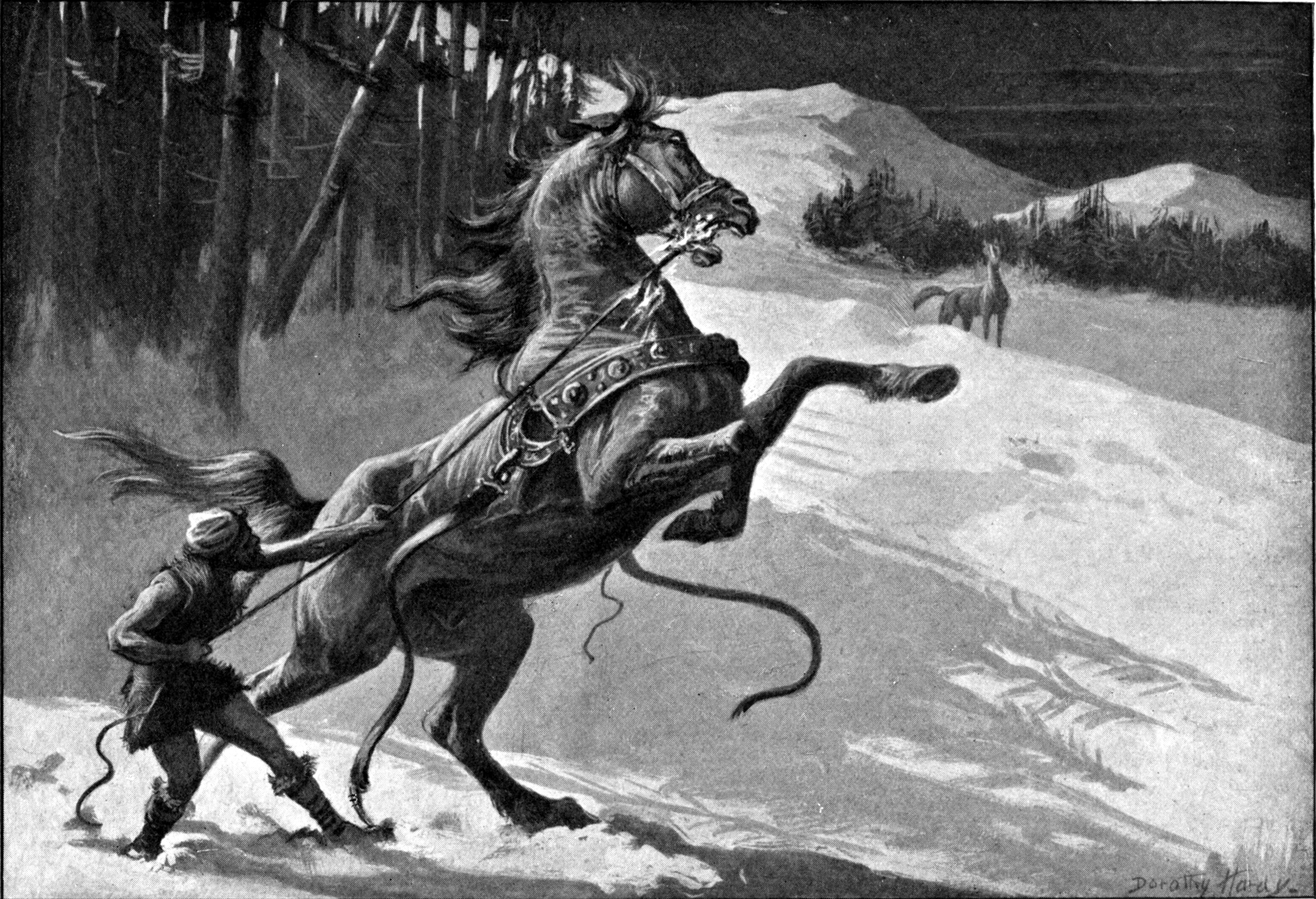
Loki and Svaðilfari (1909) by Dorothy Hardy

The gods declare that Loki deserves a horrible death if he cannot find a scheme that will cause the builder to forfeit his payment, and threaten to attack him. Loki, afraid, swears oaths that he will devise a scheme to cause the builder to forfeit the payment, whatever it may cost himself. That night, the builder drives out to fetch stone with his stallion Svaðilfari, and out from a wood runs a mare. The mare neighs at Svaðilfari, and "realizing what kind of horse it was", Svaðilfari becomes frantic, neighs, tears apart his tackle, and runs towards the mare. The mare runs to the wood, Svaðilfari follows, and the builder chases after. The two horses run around all night, causing the building to be halted and the builder is then unable to regain the previous momentum of his work.

The builder goes into a rage, and when the Æsir realize that the builder is a hrimthurs, they disregard their previous oaths with the builder, and call for Thor. Thor arrives, and subsequently kills the builder by smashing the builder's skull into shards with the hammer Mjöllnir. However, Loki "had such dealings" with Svaðilfari that "somewhat later" Loki gives birth to a gray foal with eight legs; the horse Sleipnir—"the best horse among gods and men."

===== Loki, Útgarða-Loki, and Logi =====
In chapter 44, Third reluctantly relates a tale where Thor and Loki are riding in Thor's chariot, which is pulled by his two goats. Loki and Thor stop at the house of a peasant farmer, and there they are given lodging for a night. Thor slaughters his goats, prepares them, puts them in a pot, and Loki and Thor sit down for their evening meal. Thor invites the peasant family who own the farm to share with him the meal he has prepared, but warns them not to break the bones. Afterward, at the suggestion of Loki, the peasant child Þjálfi sucks the bone marrow from one of the goat bones, and when Thor goes to resurrect the goats, he finds one of the goats to be lame. In their terror, the family atones to Thor by giving Thor their son Þjálfi and their daughter Röskva.

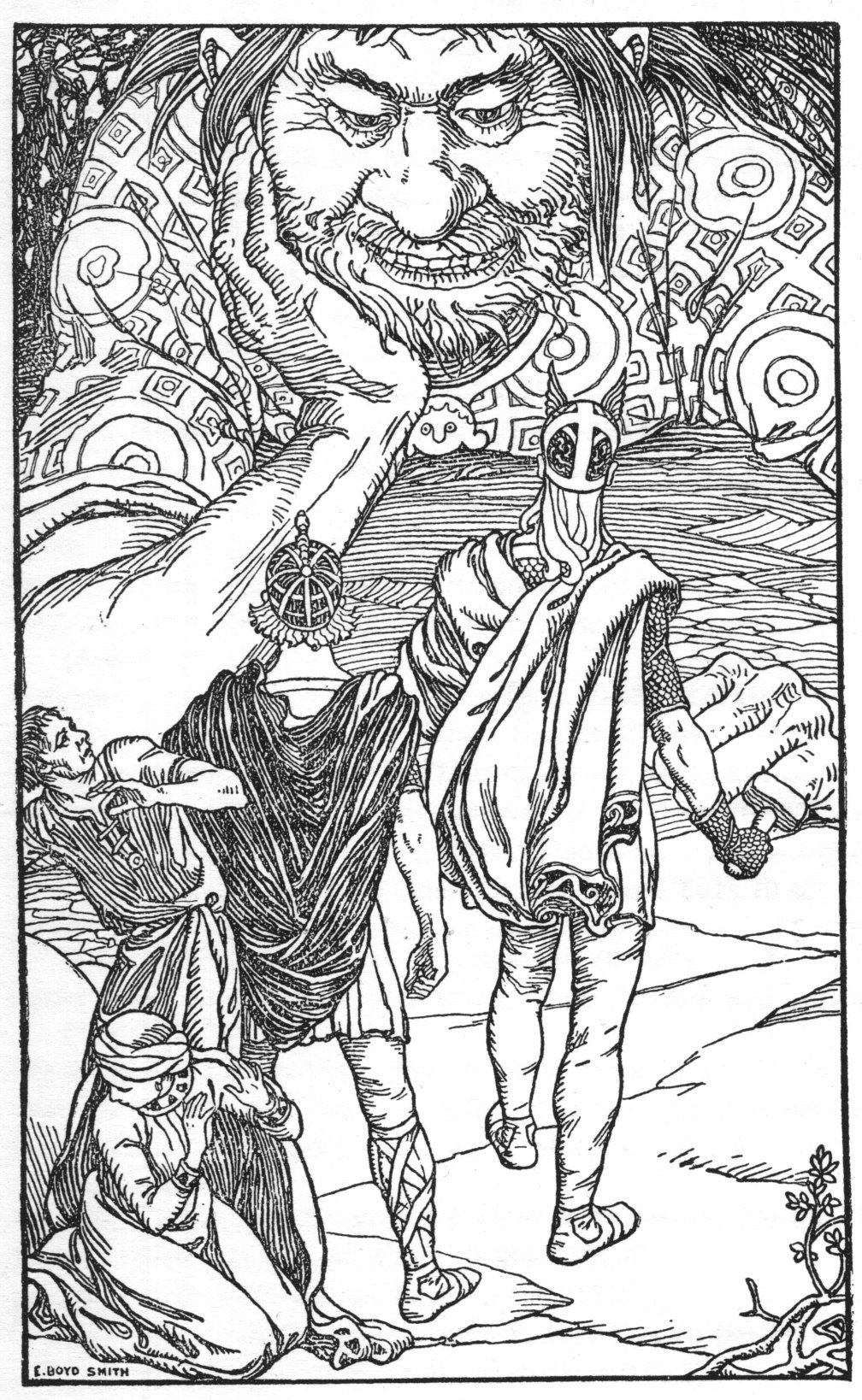
I am the giant Skrymir by Elmer Boyd Smith

Minus the goats, Thor, Loki, and the two children continue east until they arrive at a vast forest in Jötunheimr. They continue through the woods until dark. The four seek shelter for the night. They encounter an immense building. Finding shelter in a side room, they experience earthquakes through the night. The earthquakes cause all four but Thor, who grips his hammer in preparation of defense, to be fearful. The building turns out to be the huge glove of Skrymir, who has been snoring throughout the night, causing what seemed to be earthquakes. All four sleep beneath an oak tree near Skrymir in fear.

Thor wakes up in the middle of the night, and a series of events occur where Thor twice attempts to kill the sleeping Skrýmir with his hammer. Skrýmir awakes after each attempt, only to say that he detected an acorn falling on his head or that he wonders if bits of tree from the branches above have fallen on top of him. The second attempt awakes Skrýmir. Skrýmir gives them advice; if they are going to be cocky at the keep of Útgarðr it would be better for them to turn back now, for Útgarða-Loki's men there will not put up with it. Skrýmir throws his knapsack onto his back and abruptly goes into the forest. High comments that "there is no report that the Æsir expressed hope for a happy reunion".

The four travelers continue their journey until midday. They find themselves facing a massive castle in an open area. The castle is so tall that they must bend their heads back to their spines to see above it. At the entrance to the castle is a shut gate, and Thor finds that he cannot open it. Struggling, all four squeeze through the bars of the gate, and continue to a large hall. Inside the great hall are two benches, where many generally large people sit on two benches. The four see Útgarða-Loki, the king of the castle, sitting.

Útgarða-Loki says that no visitors are allowed to stay unless they can perform a feat. Loki, standing in the rear of the party, is the first to speak, claiming that he can eat faster than anyone. Útgarða-Loki comments that this would be a feat indeed, and calls for a being by the name of Logi to come from the benches. A trencher is fetched, placed on the floor of the hall, and filled with meat. Loki and Logi sit down on opposing sides. The two eat as quickly as they can and meet at the midpoint of the trencher. Loki consumed all of the meat off of the bones on his side, yet Logi had not only consumed his meat, but also the bones and the trencher itself. It was evident to all that Loki had lost. In turn, Þjálfi races against a figure by the name of Hugi three times and thrice loses.

Thor agrees to compete in a drinking contest but after three immense gulps fails. Thor agrees to lift a large, gray cat in the hall but finds that it arches his back no matter what he does, and that he can raise only a single paw. Thor demands to fight someone in the hall, but the inhabitants say doing so would be demeaning, considering Thor's weakness. Útgarða-Loki then calls for his nurse Elli, an old woman. The two wrestle but the harder Thor struggles the more difficult the battle becomes. Thor is finally brought down to a single knee. Útgarða-Loki says to Thor that fighting anyone else would be pointless. Now late at night, Útgarða-Loki shows the group to their rooms and they are treated with hospitality.

The next morning the group gets dressed and prepares to leave the keep. Útgarða-Loki appears, has his servants prepare a table, and they all merrily eat and drink. As they leave, Útgarða-Loki asks Thor how he thought he fared in the contests. Thor says that he is unable to say he did well, noting that he is particularly annoyed that Útgarða-Loki will now speak negatively about him. Útgarða-Loki points out that the group has left his keep and says that he hopes that they never return to it, for if he had an inkling of what he was dealing with he would never have allowed the group to enter in the first place. Útgarða-Loki reveals that all was not what it seemed to the group. Útgarða-Loki was in fact the immense Skrýmir, and that if the three blows Thor attempted to land had hit their mark, the first would have killed Skrýmir. In reality, Thor's blows were so powerful that they had resulted in three square valleys.

The contests, too, were an illusion. Útgarða-Loki reveals that Loki had actually competed against wildfire itself (Logi, Old Norse "flame"), Þjálfi had raced against thought (Hugi, Old Norse "thought"), Thor's drinking horn had actually reached to the ocean and with his drinks he lowered the ocean level (resulting in tides). The cat that Thor attempted to lift was in actuality the world serpent, Jörmungandr, and everyone was terrified when Thor was able to lift the paw of this "cat", for Thor had actually held the great serpent up to the sky. The old woman Thor wrestled was in fact old age (Elli, Old Norse "old age"), and there is no one that old age cannot bring down. Útgarða-Loki tells Thor that it would be better for "both sides" if they did not meet again. Upon hearing this, Thor takes hold of his hammer and swings it at Útgarða-Loki but he is gone and so is his castle. Only a wide landscape remains.

=== Norwegian rune poem ===
Loki is mentioned in stanza 13 of the Norwegian rune poem in connection with the Younger Futhark Bjarkan rune:

Old Norse:
ᛒ (Bjarkan) er laufgrønster líma;
Loki bar flærða tíma.

Modern English:
ᛒ (Birch) has the greenest leaves of any shrub;
Loki was fortunate in his deceit.

According to Bruce Dickins, the reference to "Loki's deceit" in the poem "is doubtless to Loki's responsibility for Balder's death".

== Archaeological record ==
=== Snaptun Stone ===
In 1950, a semi-circular flat stone featuring a depiction of a mustachioed face was discovered on a beach near Snaptun, Denmark. Made of soapstone that originated in Norway or Sweden, the depiction was carved around the year 1000 CE and features a face with scarred lips. The figure is identified as Loki due to his lips, considered a reference to a tale recorded in Skáldskaparmál where sons of Ivaldi stitch up Loki's lips.

The stone is identified as a hearth stone; the nozzle of the bellows would be inserted into the hole in the front of the stone, and the air produced by the bellows pushed flame through the top hole, all the while the bellows were protected from the heat and flame. The stone may point to a connection between Loki and smithing and flames. According to Hans Jørgen Madsen, the Snaptun Stone is "the most beautifully made hearth-stone that is known." The stone is housed and on display at the Moesgård Museum near Aarhus, Denmark.

=== Kirkby Stephen Stone and Gosforth Cross ===
A fragmentary late 10th-century cross located in St Stephen's Church, Kirkby Stephen, Cumbria, England, referred to as a "Loki Stone", features a bound figure with horns and a beard. This figure is sometimes theorized as depicting the bound Loki. Discovered in 1870, the stone consists of yellowish-white sandstone, and now sits at the front of the Kirkby Stephen church. A depiction of a similarly horned and round-shouldered figure was discovered in Gainford, County Durham and is now housed in Durham Cathedral Library.

The mid-11th century Gosforth Cross has been interpreted as featuring various figures from Norse mythology and, like the Kirkby Stephen Stone, is also located in Cumbria. The bottom portion of the west side of the cross features a depiction of a long-haired female, kneeling figure holding an object above another prostrate, bound figure. Above and to their left is a knotted serpent. This has been interpreted as Sigyn soothing the bound Loki.

== Scandinavian folklore ==
The notion of Loki survived into the modern period in the folklore of Scandinavia. In Denmark, Loki appeared as Lokke. In Jutland, the phrases "Lokke slår sin havre" ("Lokke is reaping his oats") and "Lokkemand driver sine geder" ("Lokkemand drives his goats") are thereby recorded in the beginning of the 20th century, the latter with the variation of simply "Lokke". In Zealand the name "Lokke lejemand" ("Lokke the Playing Man") was used. In his study of Loki's appearance in Scandinavian folklore in the modern period, Danish folklorist Axel Olrik cites numerous examples of natural phenomena explained by way of Lokke in popular folk tradition, including rising heat. An example from 1841 reads as follows:

The expressions: "Lokke (Lokki) sår havre i dag" (Lokke (Lokki) sows oats today), or: "Lokke driver i dag med sine geder" (Lokke herds his goats today), are used in several regions of Jutland, for example in Medelsom shire, the diocese of Viborg etc. ... and stand for the sight in the springtime, when the sunshine generates vapour from the ground, which can be seen as fluttering or shimmering air in the horizon of the flat landscape, similar to the hot steam over a kettle or a burning fire

And in Thy, from the same source: "... when you look at the horizon in clear weather and sunshine, and the air seems to move in shimmering waves, or like a sheet of water which seems to rise and sink in waves." Olrik further cites several different types of plants named after Loki. Olrik detects three major themes in folklore attestations; Lokke appeared as an "air phenomenon", connected with the "home fire", and as a "teasing creature of the night".

Loka Táttur or Lokka Táttur (Faroese "tale—or þáttr—of Loki") is a Faroese ballad dating to the late Middle Ages that features the gods Loki, Odin, and Hœnir helping a farmer and a boy escape the wrath of a bet-winning jötunn. The tale notably features Loki as a benevolent god in this story, although his slyness is in evidence as usual.

== Reception ==
Regarding scholarship on Loki, scholar Gabriel Turville-Petre comments (1964) that "more ink has been spilled on Loki than on any other figure in Norse myth. This, in itself, is enough to show how little scholars agree, and how far we are from understanding him."

=== Origin, role, and binding ===
Loki's origins and role in Norse mythology have historically been much debated by scholars. In 1835, Jacob Grimm was first to produce a major theory about Loki, in which he advanced the notion of Loki as a "god of fire". In 1889, Sophus Bugge theorized Loki to be variant of Lucifer of Christianity, an element of Bugge's larger effort to find a basis of Christianity in Norse mythology. After World War II, four scholarly theories dominated. The first of the four theories is that of Folke Ström, who in 1956 concluded that Loki is a hypostasis of the god Odin. In 1959, Jan de Vries theorized that Loki is a typical example of a trickster figure. In 1961, by way of excluding all non-Scandinavian mythological parallels in her analysis, Anna Birgitta Rooth concluded that Loki was originally a spider. Anne Holtsmark, writing in 1962, concluded that no conclusion could be made about Loki.

The Old Norse record presents Loki in a notably negative light and there is no indication that Loki historically received veneration. Summarizing the corpus and the archaeological record around Loki, scholar Jens Peter Schjødt says:

[I]t is clear that [Loki] was never a much venerated god, if he was venerated at all, which there is actually nothing to suggest; no sources exist relating about rituals or cultic performances in which Loki is mentioned. This means that he is known to us as a purely mythological figure, and that any function he may have had as a religious figure must be sought within this level of the religious world-view. (Schjødt 2020: 1247)

Schjødt however says that "there seems to be no doubt that the notion of Loki being bound was rather widespread within the Nordic area". (Schjødt 2020: 1258)

The scholar John Lindow highlights the recurring pattern of the bound monster in Norse mythology as being particularly associated to Loki. Loki and his three children by Angrboda were all bound in some way, and were all destined to break free at Ragnarok to wreak havoc on the world. He suggests a borrowed element from the traditions of the Caucasus region, and identifies a mythological parallel with the "Christian legend of the bound Antichrist awaiting the Last Judgment".

=== Identification with Lóðurr ===
A popular theory proposed by a variety of scholars is that Lóðurr is "a third name of Loki/Loptr". The main argument for this is that the gods Odin, Hœnir and Loki occur as a trio in Haustlöng, in the prose prologue to Reginsmál and also in the Loka Táttur a Faroese ballad, an example of Norse deities appearing in later folklore. The Odin-kenning "Lóðurr's friend" furthermore appears to parallel the kenning "Loptr's friend" and Loki is similarly referred to as "Hœnir's friend" in Haustlöng, strengthening the trio connection. While many scholars agree with this identification, it is not universally accepted. One argument against it is that Loki appears as a malevolent being later in Völuspá, seemingly conflicting with the image of Lóðurr as a "mighty and loving" figure. Many scholars, including Jan de Vries and Georges Dumézil, have also identified Lóðurr as being the same deity as Loki. Scholar Haukur Þorgeirsson suggests that Loki and Lóðurr were different names for the same deity based on that Loki is referred to as Lóður in the rímur Lokrur. Þorgeirsson argues that the writer must have had information about the identification from either a tradition or that the author drew the conclusion based on the Prose Edda, as Snorri does not mention Lóðurr. Since the contents of the Poetic Edda are assumed to have been forgotten around 1400 when the rímur was written, Haukur argues for a traditional identification. Þorgeirsson also points to Þrymlur where the same identification is made with Loki and Lóðurr. Haukur says that unless the possible but unlikely idea that the 14th- and 15th-century poets possessed written sources unknown to us is true, the idea must have come from either an unlikely amount of sources from where the poets could have drawn a similar conclusion that Loki and Lóðurr are identical (like some recent scholars) or that remnants of an oral tradition remained. Haukur concludes that if Lóðurr was historically considered an independent deity from Loki, then a discussion of when and why he became identified with Loki is appropriate.

== Modern popular culture ==
In the 19th century, Loki was depicted in a variety of ways, some strongly at odds with others. According to Stefan Arvidssen, "the conception of Loki varied during the nineteenth century. Sometimes he was presented as a dark-haired Semitic fifth columnist among the Nordic Aesir, but sometimes he was described as a Nordic Prometheus, a heroic bearer of culture".

Loki appears in Richard Wagner's opera cycle Ring of the Nibelung as Loge (a play on Old Norse loge, "fire"), depicted as an ally of the gods (specifically as Wotan's assistant rather than Donner's), although he generally dislikes them and thinks of them as greedy, as they refuse to return the Rhine Gold to its rightful owners. In the conclusion of the first opera Das Rheingold, he reveals his hope to turn into fire and destroy Valhalla, and in the final opera Götterdämmerung Valhalla is set alight, destroying the Gods.

In 2008, five black smokers were discovered between Greenland and Norway, the most northerly group so far discovered, and given the name Loki's Castle, as their shape reminded discoverers of a fantasy castle, and (a University of Bergen press release says) "Loki" was "an appropriate name for a field that was so difficult to locate".

In the 1994 film The Mask, the main character Stanley Ipkiss finds Loki's mask. Alan Cumming portrayed Loki in the 2005 sequel Son of the Mask.

In the video game Persona 5, the character of Goro Akechi utilizes a manifestation of Loki, or a "Persona," in combat. His outward, gentle prince-like personality is reflected with his Robin Hood Persona.

Loki appears in Marvel Comics and in the Marvel Cinematic Universe, played by Tom Hiddleston, as a villain (or antihero) who consistently comes into conflict with the superhero Thor, his adopted brother and archenemy.

Loki is a central character in Neil Gaiman's novel American Gods, and an important character in a few arcs of Gaiman's comic The Sandman. Loki is also a central figure in the series of fantasy novels by Joanne Harris: Runemarks, Runelight, The Gospel of Loki and The Testament of Loki.

Loki is featured in the video games Asgard's Wrath and Asgard's Wrath 2.

Loki has also appeared in the television series Supernatural, played by Richard Speight, Jr. He is described as a trickster and a demigod.

Loki appears in the video game Assassin's Creed Valhalla as part of its mythological arcs. He is featured as a boss in the Jotunheim arc, and the character Basim Ibn Ishaq is later revealed to be a human reincarnation of Loki, who within the series' lore was a member of the Isu, a technologically advanced race that predated humanity.

== See also ==
- Dystheism
