= Fimafeng =

Servant of Ægir in Norse mythology

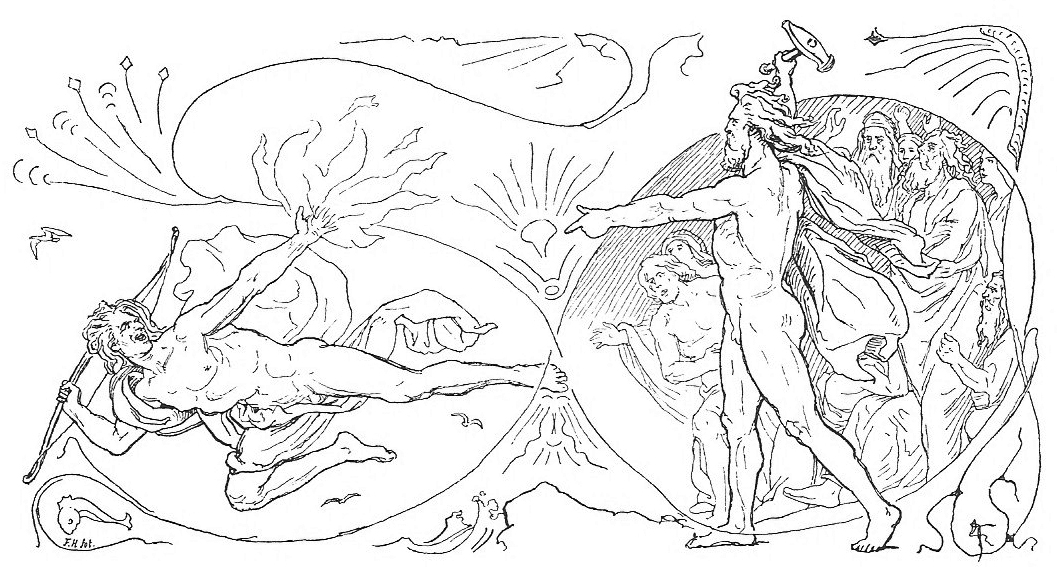

Fimafeng is one of the servants of Ægir in Norse mythology. In the Lokasenna, Fimafeng is killed out of jealousy by Loki at a party held by his master, after hearing him being lauded by the people for the banquet he had prepared to the Æsir (gods).

== Name ==
The Old Norse name Fimafeng has been translated as 'hurrying service' as well as 'five fingered'

== Attestation ==
In the beginning of Lokasenna (Loki's Flyting), Aegir's servants Fimafeng and Eldir are praised by the people for their good job at welcoming guests to a feast prepared to the Æsir (gods) and hosted by their master. The áss (god) Loki, jealous of the praise being heaped upon them, suddenly kills Fimafeng, causing the Aesir to expel him from the party. Loki eventually returns to the feast and offers an elaborate series of insults (flyting) to the Æsir and to the other servant, Eldir.
