= Vadgelmir =

Mythological river

Vadgelmir (Vaðgelmir) is a river or stream in Norse mythology. It is mentioned in the eddic poems Reginsmál (or SigurÞarkviða Fafnisbana önnur, The Second Lay of Sigurd Fafnicide) and Völuspá.

== Etymology ==
Zavaroni translates the name as "Evil-ford".

== Völuspá ==
Völuspá 39 records that breaking an oath, murder, and adultery are among the bad deeds for which entering Vadgelmir is a punishment.

== Reginsmál ==
According to a legend recounted in Reginsmál, Loki forced Andvari to tell him how liars will be punished in the Other World. Andvari responded that their punishment is to enter Vadgelmir.

One English translation of the edda describes the dialogue as follows. Loki asks: "tell me, Andvari! if thou wilt enjoy life in the halls of men, what retribution get the sons of mortals, if with foul words they assail each other". Andvari responds: "[c]ruel retribution get the sons of mortals, who in Vadgelmir wade: for the false words they have against others uttered, the punishments too long endure".

Schorn notes that there is some tension in the dialogue, as Andvari responds to Loki's highly "abstract" question about the fate of liars with a particularized description of a place.
