= Lokasenna =

Old Norse poem from the Poetic Edda

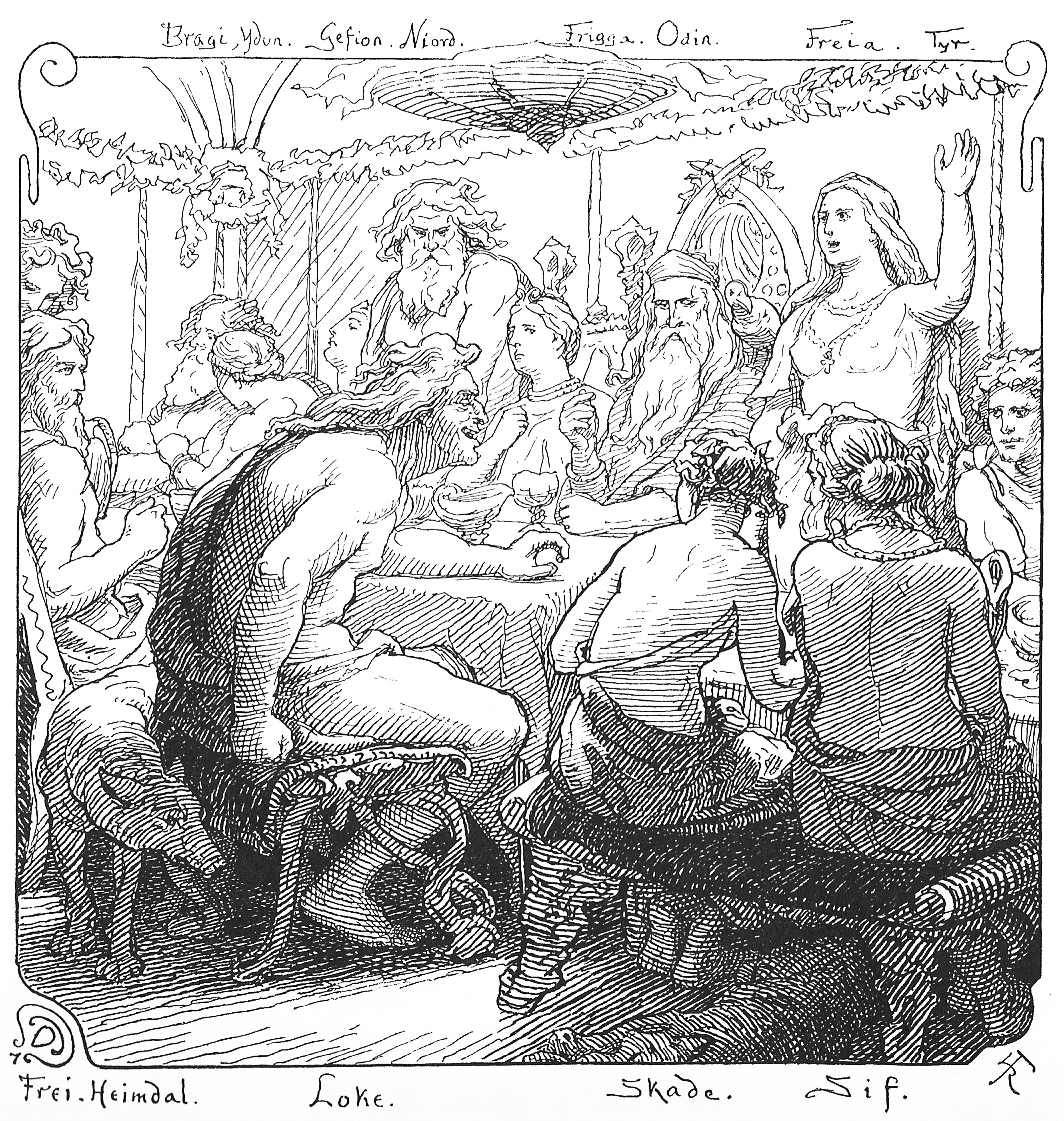
A depiction of Loki quarreling with the gods (1895) by Lorenz Frølich.

Lokasenna (Old Norse: 'The Flyting of Loki', or 'Loki's Verbal Duel') is one of the poems of the Poetic Edda. The poem presents flyting between the gods and Loki. It is written in the ljóðaháttr metre, typical for wisdom verse. Lokasenna is believed to be a 10th-century poem.

Loki, amongst other things, accuses the gods of moralistic sexual impropriety, the practice of seiðr (sorcery), and bias. Not ostensibly the most serious of allegations, these elements are, however, said ultimately to lead to the onset of Ragnarök in the Eddic poem Völuspá. However, Lokasenna does not directly state that Loki's binding is as a consequence of the killing of Baldr. This is explicitly stated only in Snorri Sturluson's Prose Edda.

Lee M. Hollander, in his introduction to his translation of the poem, claims that it was in no sense a popular lay and suggests we should not necessarily believe that the accusations of the "sly god" were an accepted part of the lore.

== Plot ==
The setting is a feast given by the sea god Ægir. In continuity, the prose introduction says: "Ægir, also named Gymir, had made ale for the Æsir, when he had received the great kettle of which was told" (see Hymiskviða). Thor did not attend, but his wife Sif came in his stead as did Bragi and his wife Iðunn. Tyr, by this time one-handed as a consequence of his sacrifice of his hand in the shackling of Loki's son, the wolf Fenrisulfr, attended, as did Niord and his wife Skaði, Freyr and Freyja, as well as Vidar, the son of Odin. Many other Vanir, Æsir, and also elves were there.

The servants of Ægir, Fimafeng and Eldir, did a thorough job of welcoming the guests; Loki was jealous of the praise being heaped upon them and slew Fimafeng. The gods were angry with Loki and drove him out of the hall, before returning to their carousing. On returning Loki encountered Eldir.

He threatened him and bade him reveal what the gods were talking about in their cups. Eldir's response was that they were discussing their might at arms, and that Loki was not welcomed.

Loki then enters the hall of Ægir after trading insults and threats with Eldir. A hush falls. Loki calls upon the rules of hospitality, demanding a seat and ale. Bragi then responds that he is unwelcome. Loki demands fulfillment of an ancient oath sworn with Odin that they should drink together. Odin asked his son Vidar to make a space for Loki.

Vidar rises and pours a drink for Loki. Before Loki drains his draught, he utters a toast to the gods but pointedly excludes Bragi from it. Bragi offers Loki a horse, a ring and a sword to placate him; Loki, however, is spoiling for a fight, and insults Bragi by questioning his courage. Bragi's response is that it would be contrary to the rules of correct behaviour to fight within his hosts' hall, but were they back in Asgard then things would be different. Iðunn, Bragi's wife, holds him back. Loki then insults Iðunn, calling her sexually loose. Gefjon is the next to speak and then Loki turns his spite on her. Odin then attempts to take a grip, as do (in turn), Freyja, Njord, Tyr, Freyr and Byggvir. The exchanges between Odin and Loki are particularly vitriolic.

Eventually Thor turns up at the party, and he is not to be placated, nor withheld. Alternating with Loki's insults to him, he says four times that he will use his hammer to knock Loki's head off if he continues. Loki replies that for Thor alone he will leave the hall, because his threats are the only ones he fears. He then leaves.

Finally there is a short piece of prose summarizing the tale of Loki's binding, which is told in fuller form in the Gylfaginning section of Snorri Sturluson's Prose Edda. Loki is chased by the gods, and caught after an unsuccessful attempt at disguising himself as a salmon. The entrails of his son Nari are used to bind him to three rocks above which Skaði places a serpent to drip venom on him. Loki's wife Sigyn remains by his side with a bowl to catch the venom; however, whenever she leaves to empty the bowl, venom falls on Loki, causing him to writhe in agony; this writhing was said to be the cause of earthquakes. The text says that Loki's other son, Narfi, was turned into a wolf, but does not make clear that he tears his brother apart; also in the Gylfaginning version it is a son of Loki named Váli whom the Æsir transform into a wolf and who kills Narfi. Some editors have therefore chosen to read the names Nari and Narvi as a mistake in the manuscript, and transcribe Nari as Váli. Nari and Narfi are otherwise considered to be variations of the same name.
