= Ægir =

One of various personifications of the sea or ocean in Norse mythology

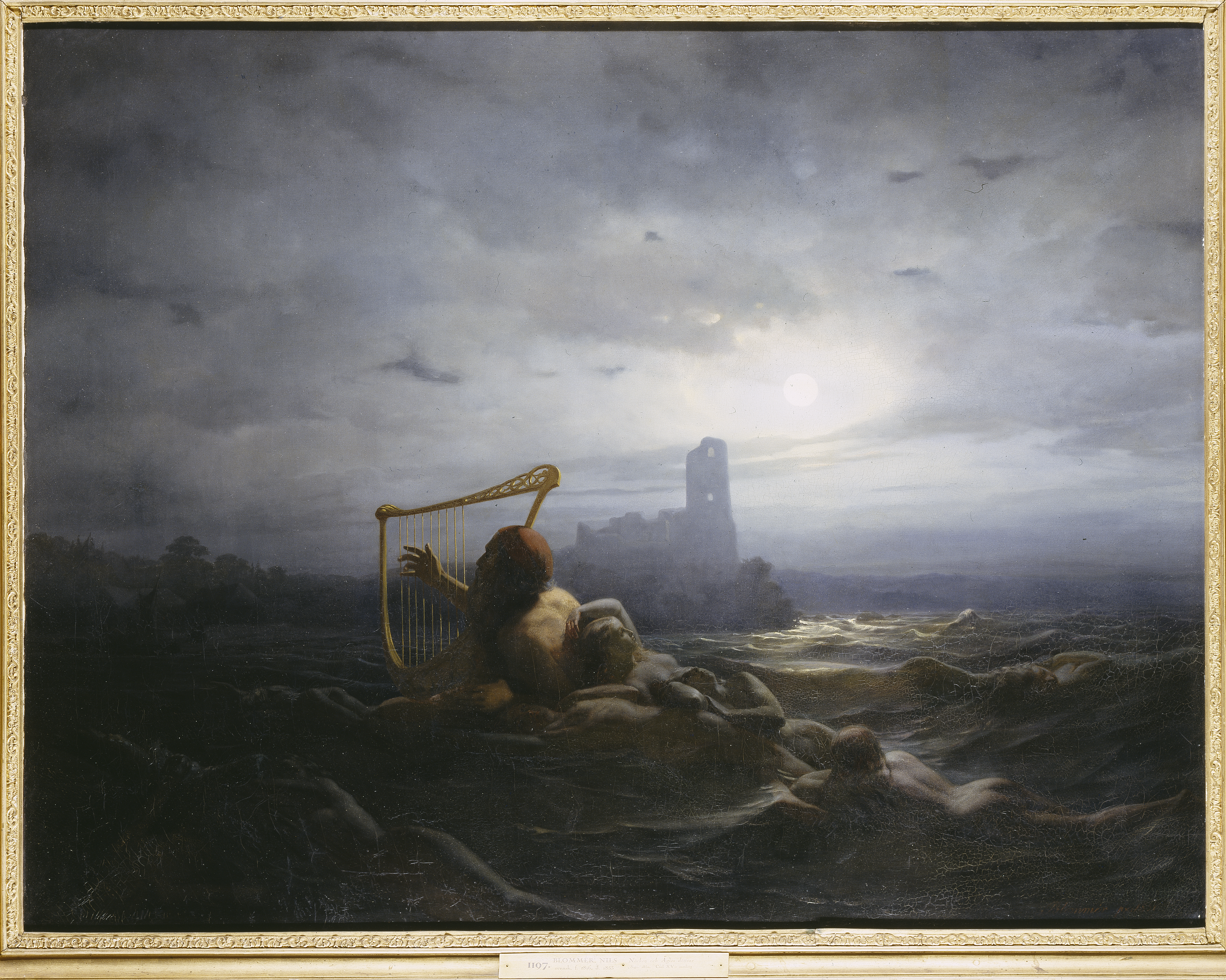
The Neck and Ægir's Daughters by Nils Blommér (1850), based on a poem by Arvid August Afzelius.

In Norse mythology, Ægir (anglicised as Aegir, Old Norse: 'sea'), Hlér (Old Norse: 'sea') or Gymir (Old Norse: 'sea' or 'engulfer') is a jötunn and personification of the sea. In the Old Norse record, Ægir hosts the gods in his halls and is associated with brewing ale. Ægir and his wife, the goddess Rán who also personified the sea, had nine daughters who were personifications of the sea waves. Ægir may also be the father of the beautiful jötunn Gerðr, wife of the god Freyr, or these may be two separate figures who share the same name (see below and Gymir).

One of Ægir's names, Hlér, is the namesake of the island Læsø (Old Norse Hlésey 'Hlér's island') and perhaps also Lejre in Denmark. Scholars have long analyzed Ægir's role in the Old Norse corpus, and the concept of the figure has had some influence in modern popular culture.

== Names ==
The Old Norse name Ægir may stem from a Proto-Germanic form reconstructed as *āg^{w}i-jaz, and interpreted as meaning 'the one of the water', or 'water-man'. The name is usually analysed as a derivative of the stem *ahwō- ('river'; cf. Gothic aƕa 'body of water, river', Old English ēa 'stream', Old High German aha 'river').

The theonym is identical to a noun for 'sea' (ægir) in skaldic poetry, itself a base word in many kennings. For instance, a ship is described as "Ægir's horse" and the waves as the "daughters of Ægir".

Poetic kennings in both Hversu Noregr byggðist (How Norway Was Settled) and Skáldskaparmál (The Language of Poetry) treat Ægir and the sea-jötunn Hlér, who lives on the Hlésey ('Hlér island', modern Læsø), as the same figure.

The meaning of the Old Norse name Gymir is unclear. Proposed translations include 'the earthly' (from Old Norse gumi), 'the wintry one' (from gemla), or 'the protector', the 'engulfer' (from geyma). (For more on this topic, see discussion below)

== Attestations ==
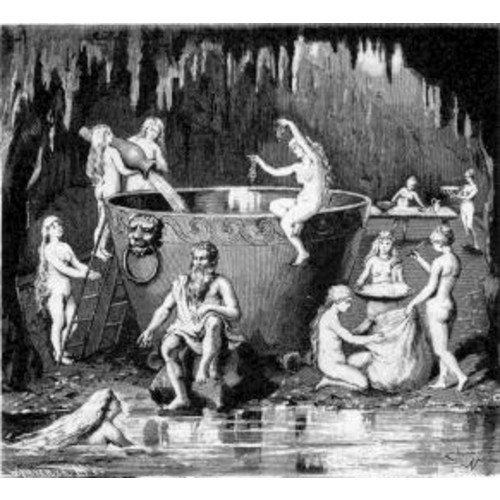
Ægir, Rán and their Nine Daughters prepare a huge vat of ale. 19th-century Swedish book illustration of the Poetic Edda.

Ægir is attested in a variety of Old Norse sources.

=== Sonatorrek ===
Ægir and Rán receive mention in the poem Sonatorrek attributed to 10th century Icelandic skald Egill Skallagrímsson. In the poem, Egill laments the death of his son Böðvar, who drowned at sea during a storm. In one difficult stanza, the skald expresses the pain of losing his son by invoking the image of slaying the personified sea, personified as Ægir (Old Norse ǫlsmið[r] 'ale-smith') and Rán (Ægis man 'Ægir's wife'):

| Veiztu um ϸá sǫk sverði of rækak, var ǫlsmið[r] allra tíma; hroða vágs brœðr ef vega mættak; fœra ek andvígr Ægis mani. | You know, if I took revenge with the sword for that offence, Ægir would be dead; if I could kill them, I would fight Ægir and Rán. |

The skald later references Ægir by way of the kenning 'Hlér's fire' (Hlés viti), meaning gold.

=== Poetic Edda ===
In the Poetic Edda, Ægir receives mention in the eddic poems Grímnismál, Hymiskviða, Lokasenna, and in the prose section of Helgakviða Hundingsbana I. In Grímnismál, the disguised god Odin references Ægir's status as a renowned host among the gods:

'Fleeting visions I have now revealed before the victory-gods's sons,
now the wished-for protection will awaken;
to the all the Æsir it will become known,
on Ægir's benches,
at Ægir's feast.'

In Hymiskviða, Ægir plays a major role. In the poem, the gods have become thirsty after a successful hunt, and are keen to celebrate with drink. They "shook the twigs and looked at the augury" and "found that at Ægir's was an ample choice of cauldrons". Odin goes to Ægir, who he finds sitting in good cheer, and tells him he shall "often prepare a feast for the Æsir". Referring to Ægir as a jötunn, the poem describes how, now annoyed, Ægir hatches a plan: He asks Thor to fetch a particular cauldron, and that with it he could brew ale for them all. The gods are unable to find a cauldron of a size big enough to meet Ægir's request until the god Týr recommends one he knows of far away, setting the stage for the events of the rest of the poem.

According to the prose introduction to Lokasenna, "Ægir, who is also called Gymir", was hosting a feast "with the great cauldron which has just been told about", which many of the gods and elves attended. The prose introduction describes the feast as featuring gold that shimmers like fire light and ale that serves itself, and that "it was a great place of peace". In attendance also were Ægir's servers, Fimafeng and Eldir. The gods praise the excellence of their service and, hearing this, Loki murders Fimafeng, enraging the gods, who chase him out to the woods before returning to drink.

In the poem that follows the prose introduction (and in accompanying prose), Loki returns to the hall and greets Eldir: He says that before Eldir steps forward, he should first tell him what the gods are discussing in the hall. Eldir says that they're discussing weaponry and war, and having nothing good to say about Loki. Loki says that he will enter Ægir's halls and have a look at the feast, and with him bring quarrel and strife. Eldir notifies Loki that if he enters and causes trouble, he can expect them to return it to him. Loki enters the hall and the gods see him and become silent.

In Helgakviða Hundingsbana I, a great wave is referred to as "Ægir's terrible daughter".

=== Prose Edda ===
Ægir receives numerous mentions in the Prose Edda book Skáldskaparmál, where he sits at a banquet and asks the skaldic god Bragi many questions, and Bragi responds with narratives about the gods. The section begins as follows:

Anthony Faulkes translation (1987):
There was a person whose name was Ægir or Hler. He lived on an island which is now called Hlesey. He was very skilled in magic. He set out to visit Asgard, and when the Æsir became aware of his movements, he was given a great welcome, though many things had deceptive appearances.

Andy Orchard translation (1997):

There was a figure called Ægir or Hlér; he lived on an island, which is now called Hléysey. He was very crafty in magic. He set off to visit Ásgard, and when the Æsir realized he was coming, he was given a splen did welcome, although many things were not as they seemed;

J. Lindow translation (2002):
A man was named Ægir or Hlér; he lived on that island which is now called Hlér's Island. He had much magic knowledge. He made his way to Ásgard, but the æsir knew of his journey in advance. He was well received, but many things were done with illusions.

Beyond this section of Skáldskaparmál, Ægir receives several other mentions in kennings. Section 25 provides examples for 'sea', including 'visitor of the gods', 'husband of Rán', 'father of Ægir's daughters', 'land of Rán and Ægir's daughters'. Kennings cited to skalds in this section include 'the storm-happy daughters of Ægir' meaning 'waves' (Svein) and a kenning in a fragment of a work by the 11th century Icelandic skald Hofgarða-Refr Gestsson, where Rán is referred to as 'Gymir's ... völva':

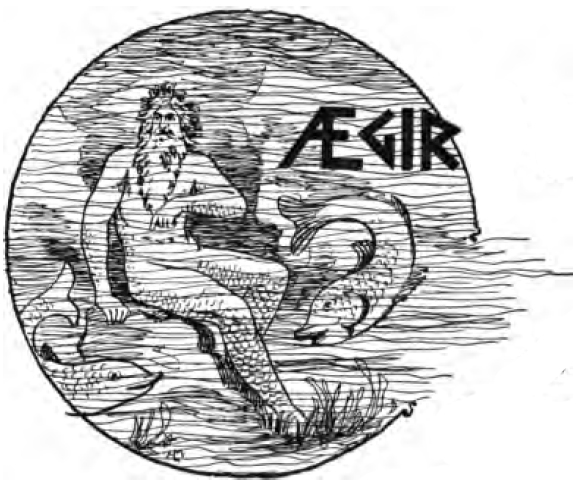
An anonymous illustration of Ægir published in 1901

Standardized Old Norse

Ok sem kvað Refr:

Fœrir bjǫrn, þar er bára
brestr, undinna festa
opt í Ægis kjǫpta
*ursǫl Gymis vǫlva.

Anthony Faulkes translation

And as Ref said:

Gymir's spray-cold spæ-wife often brings the twisted-rope-bear [ship] into Ægir's jaws [under the waves] where the wave breaks.

The section's author comments that the stanza "[implies] that they are all the same, Ægir and Hler and Gymir.

Chapter 33b of Skáldskaparmál discusses why skalds may refer to gold as "Ægir's fire". The section traces the kenning to a narrative surrounding Ægir, in which the jötunn employs "glowing gold" in the center of his hall to light it "like fire" (which the narrator compares to flaming swords in Valhalla). The section explains that "Ran is the name of Ægir's wife, and the names of their nine daughters are as was written above ... Then the Æsir discovered that Ran had a net in which she caught everyone that went to sea ... so this is the story of the origin of gold being called fire or light or brightness of Ægir, Ran or Ægir's daughters, and from such kennings the practice has now developed of calling gold fire of the sea and of all terms for it, since Ægir and Ran's names are also terms for the sea, and hence gold is now called fire of lakes or rivers and of all river-names."

In chapter 61 provides yet more kennings. Among them the author notes that "Ran, who, it is said, was Ægir's wife" and that "the daughters of Ægir and Ran are nine". In chapter 75, Ægir occurs in a list of jötnar.

=== Saga corpus ===
In what appears to be a Norwegian genealogical tradition, Ægir is portrayed as one of the three elements among the sea, the fire and the wind. The beginning of the Orkneyinga saga ('Saga of the Orkney Islanders') and Hversu Noregr byggdisk ('How Norway Was Settled') tell that the jötunn king Fornjót had three sons: Hlér ('sea'), whom he called Ægir, a second named Logi ('fire'), and a third called Kári ('wind').

== Scholarly reception and interpretation ==
=== Banquets ===
Carolyne Larrington says that Ægir's role in Hymiskviða "may reflect Scandinavian royal practices in which the king enforces his authority on his subordinates by visiting their homes and demanding to be feasted". According to Andy Orchard, Ægir's role in Skáldskaparmál, where he attends a banquet rather than hosting it, could be a deliberate inversion of the traditional motif of Ægir as host.

=== Gymir ===
The name Gymir may indicate that Ægir was understood as the father of the beautiful jötunn Gerðr; they may also have been two different figures sharing the same name (see Gymir, father of Gerðr). Both the prose introduction to Lokasenna and Skáldskaparmál state that Ægir is also known as Gymir, the father of the jötunn Gerðr. Rudolf Simek argues that, if understood to be two different entities, this may stem from an erroneous interpretation of kennings in which different jötunn-names are used interchangeably.

=== Hlér, Læsø, Lejre, and Snow ===
As highlighted above in Skáldskaparmál, the name of the island Læsø in Denmark references Hlér (Old Norse Hléysey 'Hlér's Island'). Simek speculates that Hlér may therefore have been seen as something of an ancestor of the island.

Some medieval Danish chronicles mention Hler and connect him with a figure named Snær (Old Norse 'snow'). In the Latin-language Chronicon Lethrense ("Chronicle of Lejre"; the name Lejre may, like Læsø, derive from Hler) and Old Danish Gesta Danorum på danskæ, a giant named Lae (or Lee) who lived on the island of Leshø had a shepherd named Snyo (or Snio, from Old Norse Snær 'Snow'). When Raka, the dog king of the Danes had died, Lae sent Snyo to win the kingship of Denmark from King Athisl of Sweden, which he did. King Snyo was cruel to his subjects, and only a man named Røth (or Roth) would stand up to him. Snyo sent Røth to Lae's island to ask Lae how King Snyo would die, but expecting that Røth would die in the attempt. Lae refused to answer Røth's request until Røth had said three truthful things. Røth said that he had never seen thicker walls on a house than on Lae's, that he had never seen a man with so many heads as Lae, and that if he got away from there, he would never long to be back. Lae therefore released Røth and prophesied that Snyo would die from being bitten to death by lice. In the Chronicon Lethrense, Røth only announces this in Snyo's court before lice erupt from Snyo's nostrils and ears to eat him to death; in the Gesta Danorum på danskæ, Lae gives Røth a pair of gloves for Snyo, who is eaten to death by lice when he pulls them on.

=== Jötunn ===
Scholars have often discussed Ægir's role as host to the gods and his description as a jötunn. Anthony Faulkes observes that Ægir is "often described by modern writers as god of the sea" yet that he is nowhere described as a god in the Prose Edda and appears in a list of jötnar in Skáldskaparmál. According to John Lindow, since his wife Rán is listed among the Ásynjur (goddesses) in the same part of the Prose Edda, and since he had a close and friendly relationship with the Æsir (gods), Ægir's description as a jötunn appears questionable. Andy Orchard argues on the contrary that Ægir's inclusion among the Æsir is probably a late development since his daughters are described as jötnar and some sources mention him as the descendant of the jötunn Fornjót. According to Rudolf Simek, while attested as a jötunn, Ægir "has characteristics" of a sea god.

== Modern representations and influence ==
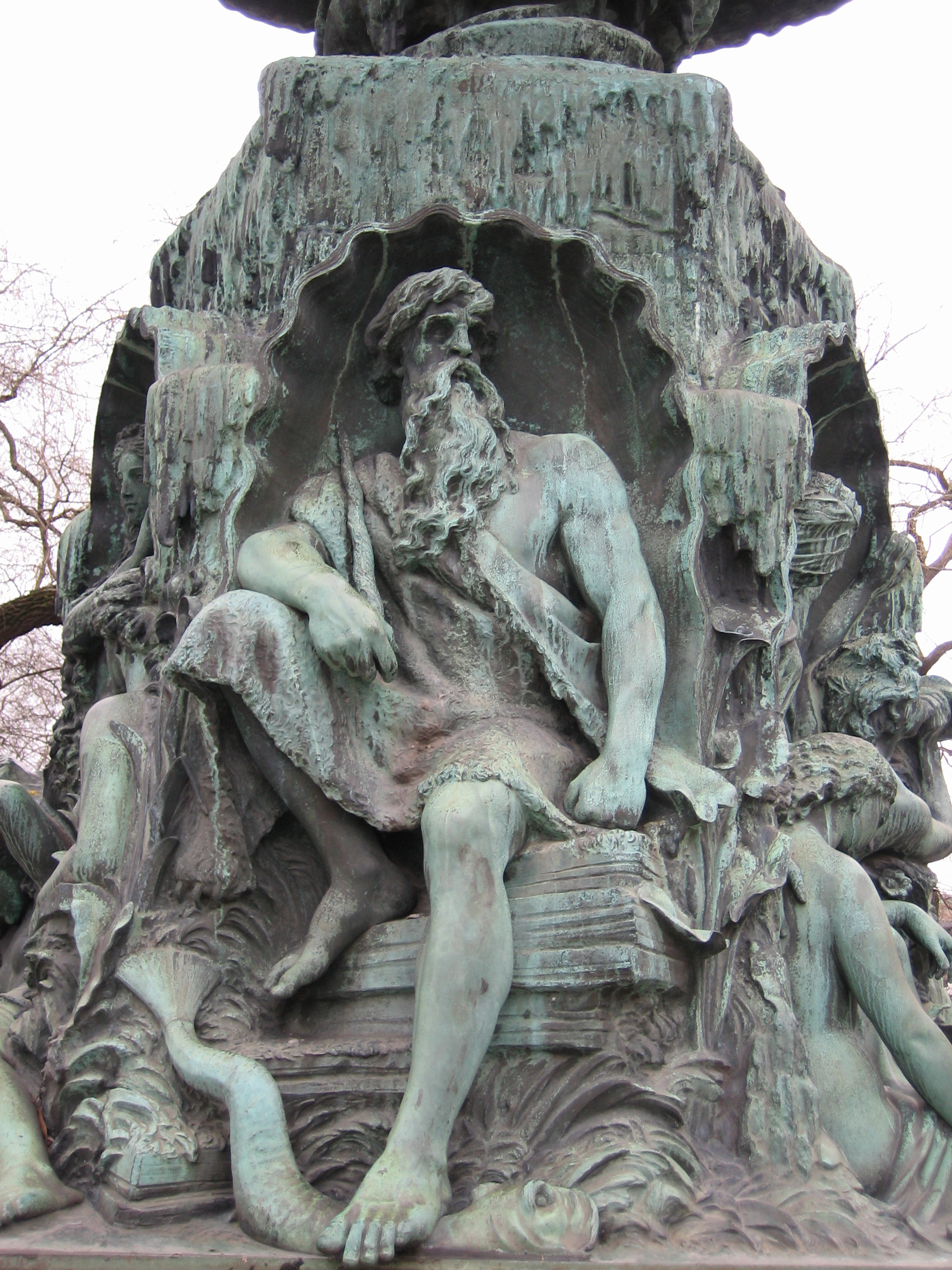
J. P. Molin's fountain relief featuring Ægir and his 9 daughters

The mineral aegirine, first described from samples in Kongsberg, Norway, in 1821, was named after Ægir.

Ægir has been the subject of a variety of art pieces. These include Swedish artist Nils Blommér's painting Näcken och Ägirs döttrar (1850); Swedish sculptor's Johan Peter Molin's (d. 1874) fountain relief Ægir; and German illustrator Emil Doepler's Ægir (1901).

He is also the namesake of a Norwegian corvette produced in 1967 (Ægir), a coastal defense ship in the Imperial German Navy, as well as many other ships.

An exoplanet, Epsilon Eridani b, discovered in 2000, was formally named Ægir.

In modern popular culture, the name Ægir is referenced in the Japanese anime and manga series Boku no Hero Academia, where the superhero Shoto Todoroki has a move called the "Great Glacial Aegir".

== See also ==
- Ler (mythology), figure from Irish folklore
- Njörðr, Norse deity associated with the sea
- Trent Aegir, tidal bore on the River Trent
