= Sons of Odin =

Norse gods

Various gods and men appear as sons of Odin (Old English: Wōden, Old Norse: Óðinn) in Old Norse and Old English texts.

== Thor, Baldr, Víðarr and Váli ==
Four gods, Thor, Baldr, Víðarr and Váli, are explicitly identified as sons of Odin in the Eddic poems, in the skaldic poems, in Saxo Grammaticus' Gesta Danorum, and in the Gylfaginning section of Snorri Sturluson's Prose Edda. But silence on the matter does not indicate that other gods whose parentage is not mentioned in these works might not also be sons of Odin.

== Other gods called sons of Odin by Snorri Sturluson ==
In various kennings recorded in the Skáldskaparmál section of the Prose Edda, Snorri also describes Heimdallr, Bragi, Týr, Höðr, and Hermóðr as sons of Odin, information that appears nowhere else outside Skáldskaparmál.

1. For Heimdall, there is no variant account of his father.
2. The same may not be true for Bragi if Bragi is taken to be the skaldic poet Bragi Boddason made into a god.
3. But Týr, according to the Eddic poem Hymiskviða, was son of the giant Hymir rather than a son of Odin.
4. As to Höðr, outside of the single statement in the kennings, Snorri makes no mention that Höðr is Baldr's brother or Odin's son, though one might expect that to be emphasized. In Saxo's version of the death of Baldr, Höðr, whom Saxo calls Høtherus, is a mortal and in no way related to Saxo's demi-god Balderus.
5. Hermóðr appears in Snorri's Gylfaginning as the messenger sent by Odin to Hel to seek to bargain for Baldr's release. He is called "son" of Odin in most manuscripts, but in the Codex Regius version—the Codex Regius is normally considered the best manuscript—Hermóðr is called sveinn Óðins, 'Odin's boy', which might mean Odin's son but in the context is as likely to mean Odin's servant. However, when Hermóðr arrives in Hel's hall, he calls Baldr his brother. To confuse matters, other texts know of a mortal hero named Hermóðr or Heremod.

== An alternative list of Odin's sons ==
In the Nafnaþulur section of Skáldskaparmál, there is a list of the sons of Odin, which does not altogether fit with what Snorri writes elsewhere. Nafnaþulur is not in all manuscripts of the Edda and appear independently, and are probably a later addition to Snorri's original composition.

Nafnaþulur is omitted from some editions and translations, but it is included in Anthony Faulkes' 1982 translation. The text from Faulkes' translation reads:

Odin's sons are Baldr and Meili, Vidar and Nep, Vali, Ali, Thor and Hildolf, Hermod, Sigi, Skiold, Yngvi-Freyr and Itreksiod, Heimdall, Sæming.

This list includes:

- the 4 gods who are most widely attested as sons of Odin (Thor, Baldr, Víðarr and Váli; see above);
- 2 other gods mentioned as sons of Odin in kennings in Skáldskaparmál (Hermóðr and Heimdall; see above);
- 4 men who are the origin of Scandinavian royal dynasties (Sigi, Skjöldr, Yngvi and Sæmingr; see below). All appear in Snorri's pseudo-historical Prologue to the Prose Edda as sons of Odin and founders of these various lineages, perhaps all thought to be sons of Odin begotten on mortal women;
- 5 other figures (Meili, Nepr, Hildólfr, Ali, Ítreksjóð):
  - Meili is mentioned in the eddic poem Hárbarðsljóð, where Thor calls himself Odin's son, Meili's brother, and Magni's father.
  - In Gylfaginning, Nepr is the father of Baldur's wife Nanna. If this list is correct in giving Odin a son named Nep, and if that Nep is identical to the father of Nanna mentioned by Snorri, then Nanna would also be Baldur's niece. But marriage between uncle and niece, though common in many cultures, does not normally appear in old Scandinavian literature.
  - The name Hildólfr appears in the eddic poem Hárbarðsljóð, applied by the ferryman Hárbarðr to his supposed master. But Harbard is actually Odin in disguise and there is no clear reference here to a son of Odin.
  - In Gylfaginning, Ali is only another name for Váli.
  - The otherwise unrecorded Ítreksjóð, meaning "offspring of Ítrekr", may be a reference to any of the sons of Odin. Ít-rekr ("glorious ruler") is a name of Odin.

Týr, Höðr, and Bragi are conspicuously absent from this list, despite being mentioned as sons of Odin elsewhere in Skáldskaparmál. This is one reason to believe it is not from Snorri's hand. Some manuscripts have a variant version of the list which adds Höðr and Bragi to the end and replaces Yngvi-Frey with an otherwise unknown Ölldner or Ölner. This may be an attempt to bring the list into accord with Snorri, even though it still lacks Týr. Some manuscripts add additional names of sons of Odin which are otherwise unknown: "Ennelang, Eindride, Bior, Hlodide, Hardveor, Sönnöng, Vinthior, Rymur."

== Founders of dynasties ==
The prologue to Snorri's Edda and the alternative list discussed above both include the following:

- Sigi. He was made the ancestor of the Völsung lineage (see Völsunga saga), who were Burgundian kings according to Snorri.
- Skjöld. He was ancestor of the Danish Skjölding dynasty. In Snorri's Ynglinga Saga in the Heimskringla, Skjöld's wife is the goddess Gefjön and the same account occurs in most, but not all, manuscripts of the Edda. But Saxo makes Skjöld the son of Lother son of Dan. And in English tradition, Skjöld (called Scyld or Sceldwa) is son of Sceafa or of Heremod when a father is named.
- Yngvi. A son of Odin in the prologue to the Edda but identified with Frey son of Njörd in the Ynglinga Saga. In both accounts, this figure is made ancestor of the Yngling dynasty in Sweden (from which later kings of Norway also traced their descent). (A Faroese ballad recorded in 1840 names Odin's son as Veraldur, this Veraldur being understood as another name of Frö, that is of Frey.)
- Sæming. Sæming is ancestor of a line of Norwegian kings. Snorri's Ynglinga Saga relates that after the giantess Skaði broke off her marriage with Njörd, she "married afterwards Odin, and had many sons by him, of whom one was called Sæming" from whom Jarl Hákon claimed descent. Snorri then quotes a relevant verse by the poet Eyvindr skáldaspillir. However, in his preface to the Heimskringla, Snorri says that Eyvindr's Háleygjatal which reckoned up the ancestors of Jarl Hákon brought in Sæming as son of Yngvi-Frey. Snorri may have slipped here, thinking of the Ynglings. As to the many sons, it is possible that some of the otherwise unknown sons in the previous section may be sons purportedly born by Skadi.

According to Herrauds saga:

- Gauti. Gauti's son Hring ruled Östergötland (East Götaland), so Gauti appears to be the eponym of the Geatas in Beowulf. Some versions of the English royal line of Wessex add names above that of Woden, purportedly giving Woden's ancestry, though the names are now usually thought be in fact another royal lineage that has been at some stage erroneously pasted onto the top of the standard genealogy. Some of these genealogies end in Geat, whom it is reasonable to think might be Gauti. The account in the Historia Britonum calls Geat a son of a god, which fits. But Asser, in his Life of Alfred, writes instead that the pagans worshipped this Geat himself for a long time as a god. In Old Norse texts, Gaut is itself a very common byname for Odin. Jordanes, in The origin and deeds of the Goths, traces the line of the Amelungs up to Hulmul son of Gapt, purportedly the first Gothic hero of record. This Gapt is felt by many commentators to be an error for Gaut or Gauti.

According to Hervarar saga ok Heidreks konungs ("The Saga of Hervor and King Heidrek") versions H and U:

- Sigrlami. He was son of Odin and king of Gardariki. His son Svafrlami succeeded him. Svafrlami forced the dwarves Dvalinn and Durin to forge for him a superb sword, Tyrfing. They did so and cursed it. In version R, Sigrlami takes on the role of Svafrlami and his parentage is not given.

In the prologue to the Edda, Snorri also mentions sons of Odin who ruled among the continental Angles and Saxons and provides information about their descendants that is identical, or very close, to traditions recorded in the Anglo-Saxon Chronicle. Snorri here may be dependent on English traditions. The sons mentioned by both Snorri and the Anglo-Saxon Chronicle are:

- Vegdagr/Wægdæg/Wecta. According to Snorri, Vegdeg ruled East Saxony. In the Anglo-Saxon Chronicle, the Wecta form of the name heads the lineage of the kings of Kent (of whom Hengest is traditionally the first), and the Wægdæg form of the name heads the lineage of the kings of Deira. The Anglian collection of Anglo-Saxon royal genealogies places the name Wægdæg in both pedigrees, while Snorri relates a single descent through Vegdeg and his son that later splits into two branches leading to the Kent and Deira ancestors.
- Beldeg. According to Snorri's prologue, Beldeg was identical to Baldur and ruled in Westphalia. There is no independent evidence of the identification of Beldeg with Baldur. From Beldeg, the Anglo-Saxon Chronicle traces the kings of Bernicia and Wessex. Historia Brittonum derives the kings of Deira from Beldeg rather than from Wægdæg.

Other Anglo-Saxon genealogies mention:

- Weothulgeot or Wihtlæg. According to the genealogies in the Anglian collection, Weothulgeot was ancestor to the royal house of Mercia and the father of Wihtlæg. According to the Historia Brittonum, Weothulgeot was father of Weaga, who was father of Wihtlæg. But the two Anglo-Saxon Chronicle versions of this genealogy include neither Weothulgeot nor Weaga, but make Wihtlæg himself the son of Woden. In all versions, Wihtlæg is father of Wermund, father of Offa of Angel. According to the Old English poem Widsith, Offa ruled over the continental Angles. Saxo, though not mentioning Wihtlæg's parentage, introduces Wihtlæg as a Danish king named Wiglek, who was the slayer of Amleth (Hamlet).
- Casere (Kjárr). He was made ancestor to the royal house of East Anglia and is thought to represent none other than Julius Caesar.
- Winta. He was made ancestor to the royal house of Lindsey/Lindisfarne. This genealogy is found only in the Anglian collection, not in the Anglo-Saxon Chronicle.
- Seaxnēat. Made ancestor of the kings of Essex. He is mentioned as Saxnôte alongside Uuôden (Wodan) and Thunaer (Thunor) in the Old Dutch/Saxon Baptismal Vow. He was originally at the top of the Essex pedigree, and only later was made son of Woden to harmonize with the other Anglo-Saxon royal pedigrees.

== Froger ==
Saxo Grammaticus' Gesta Danorum (Book 4) speaks of Froger, the King of Norway, who was a great champion. Saxo relates:

According to some, he was the son of Odin, and when he begged the immortal gods to grant him a boon, received the privilege that no man should conquer him, save he who at the time of the conflict could catch up in his hand the dust lying beneath Froger's feet.

King Fródi the Active of Denmark, still a young man, learning of the charm, begged Froger to give him lessons in fighting. When the fighting court had been marked off, Fródi entered with glorious gold-hilted sword and clad in a golden breastplate and helmet. Fródi then begged a boon from Froger, that they might change positions and arms. Froger agreed. After the exchange, Fródi caught up some dust from where Froger had been standing and then quickly defeated Froger in battle and slew him.

== Loki in modern literature ==
In modern literature (such as Marvel Comics) it has become popular to portray Loki as the adopted son of Odin. This however has no basis in Norse mythology, where Loki is portrayed as the blood brother of Odin, as mentioned in Lokasenna:

Loki kvað:
‘Mantu þat, Óðinn, er vit í árdaga
blendum blóði saman?
Ǫlvi bergja léztu eigi mundu,
nema okkr væri báðum borit!’ — Edward Pettit's edition

Loki said:
‘Do you recall it, Óðinn, when in ancient days
we two blended blood together?
You said you wouldn’t taste ale,
unless it were brought to us both!’ — Edward Pettit's translation

== See also ==
- List of Germanic deities
