= Scandinavia =

Subregion of northern Europe

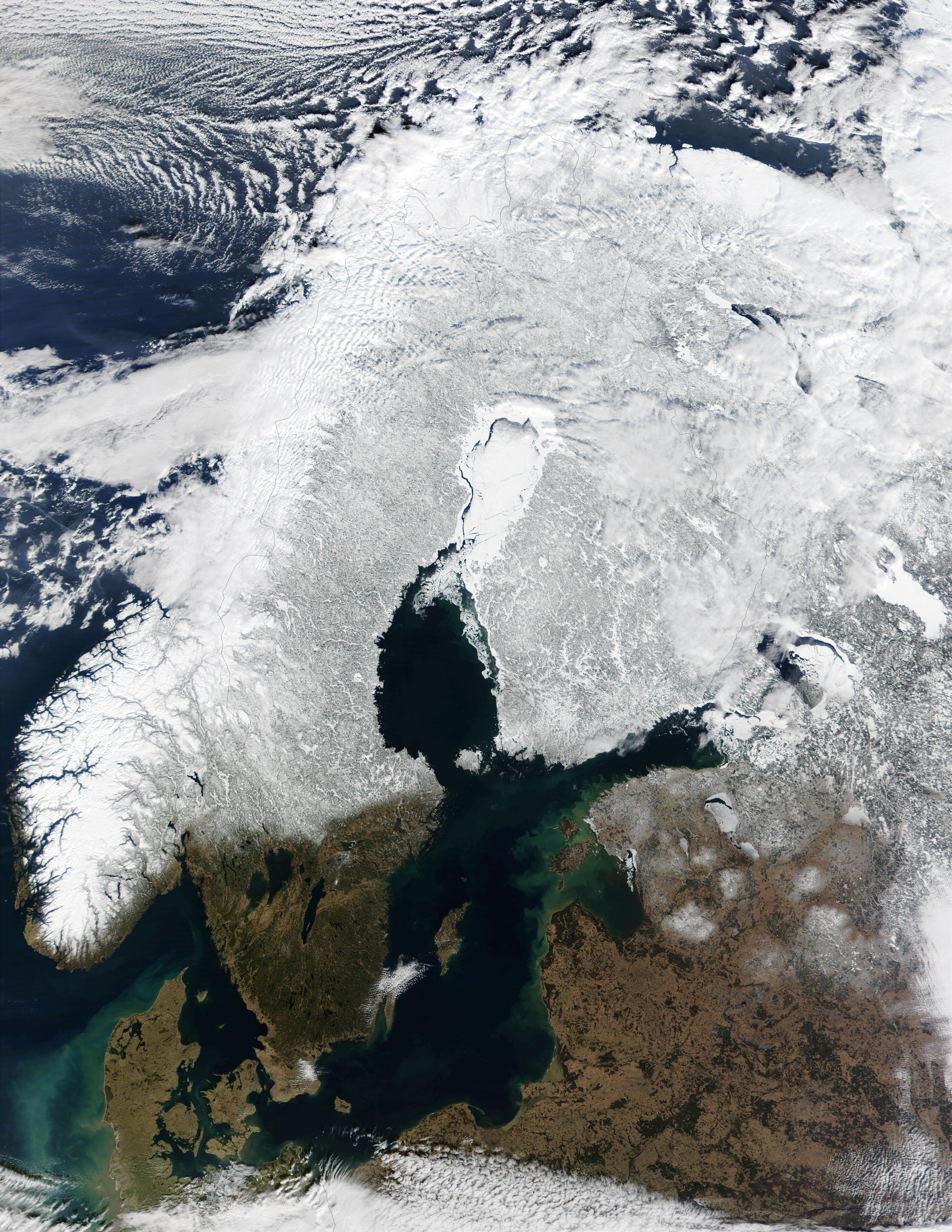
- Photo of the Fennoscandian Peninsula and Denmark, as well as other areas surrounding the Baltic Sea, in March 2002
- Languages: List of languages: Official languages; Swedish; Danish; Norwegian; Sometimes also: Finnish; Icelandic; Faroese; Recognized minority languages; Meänkieli, Karelian, Kven; German; Romani, Scandoromani; Sámi languages (official in Sámi administrative areas); Yiddish
- Demonym: Scandinavian
- Composition: Denmark; Norway; Sweden; In English usage, 'Scandinavia' is often used more loosely to include: Åland; Faroe Islands; Finland; Iceland Nordic territories that are not part of Scandinavia: Bouvet Island; Greenland; Jan Mayen; Svalbard
- Internet TLD: .dk, .no, .se; .ax, .fi, .fo, .is

Scandinavia is a subregion of northern Europe that most commonly comprises Denmark, Norway, and Sweden, which share strong historical, cultural, and linguistic ties. It may also refer to the Scandinavian Peninsula (which excludes Denmark but includes part of northern Finland). In English usage, the term is also sometimes used as a synonym for the Nordic countries. Iceland and the Faroe Islands are sometimes included, due to their ethnolinguistic ties to Sweden, Norway, and Denmark. Although Finland differs from the other Nordic countries in this respect, some authors consider it Scandinavian because of its economic and cultural similarities.

The geography of the region is varied, from the Norwegian fjords in the west and Scandinavian mountains covering parts of Norway and Sweden, to the low and flat areas of Denmark in the south, as well as archipelagos and lakes in the east. Most of the population in the region live in the more temperate southern regions, with the northern parts having long, cold winters.

During the Viking Age Scandinavian peoples participated in large-scale raiding, conquest, colonization and trading mostly throughout Europe. They also used their longships for exploration, becoming the first Europeans to reach North America. These exploits saw the establishment of the North Sea Empire which comprised large parts of Scandinavia and Great Britain, though it was relatively short-lived. Scandinavia was eventually Christianized, and the coming centuries saw various unions of Scandinavian nations, most notably the Kalmar Union of Denmark, Norway and Sweden, which lasted for over 100 years until the Swedish king Gustav I led Sweden out of the union. Denmark and Norway, as well as Schleswig-Holstein, were then united until 1814 as Denmark–Norway. Numerous wars between the nations followed, which shaped the modern borders and led to the establishment of the Swedish Empire in the 17th and early 18th centuries. The most recent Scandinavian union was the union between Sweden and Norway, which ended in 1905.

In modern times the region has prospered, with the economies of the countries being amongst the strongest in Europe. Sweden, Denmark, Norway, Iceland, and Finland all maintain welfare systems considered to be generous, with the economic and social policies of the countries being dubbed the "Nordic model".

== Geography ==
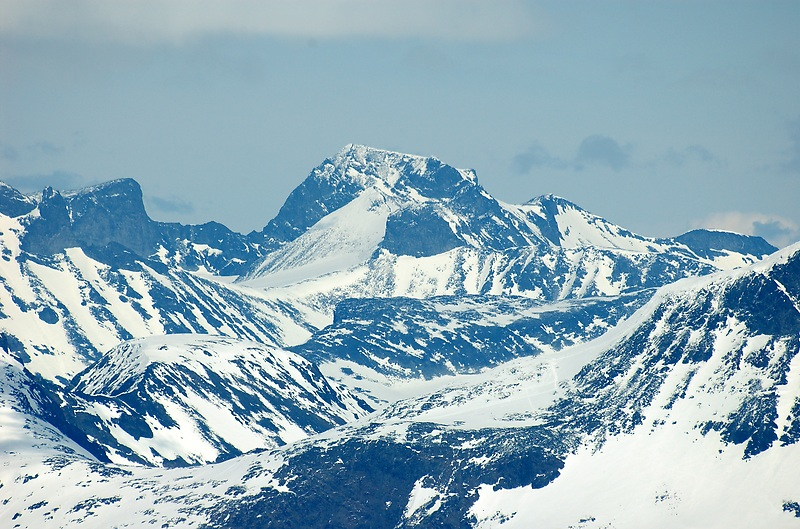
Galdhøpiggen is the highest point in Scandinavia and is a part of the Scandinavian Mountains.

The geography of Scandinavia is extremely varied. Notable are the Norwegian fjords, the Scandinavian Mountains covering much of Norway and parts of Sweden, the flat, low areas in Denmark and the archipelagos of Finland, Norway and Sweden. Finland and Sweden have many lakes and moraines, legacies of the ice age, which ended about ten millennia ago.

The southern regions of Scandinavia, which are also the most populous regions, have a temperate climate. Scandinavia extends north of the Arctic Circle, but has relatively mild weather for its latitude due to the Gulf Stream. Many of the Scandinavian mountains have an alpine tundra climate.

The climate varies from north to south and from west to east: a marine west coast climate (Cfb) typical of western Europe dominates in Denmark, the southernmost part of Sweden and along the west coast of Norway reaching north to 65°N, with orographic lift giving more mm/year precipitation (<5000 mm) in some areas in western Norway. The central part – from Oslo to Stockholm – has a humid continental climate (Dfb), which gradually gives way to subarctic climate (Dfc) further north and cool marine west coast climate (Cfc) along the northwestern coast. A small area along the northern coast east of the North Cape has tundra climate (Et) as a result of a lack of summer warmth. The Scandinavian Mountains block the mild and moist air coming from the southwest, thus northern Sweden and the Finnmarksvidda plateau in Norway receive little precipitation and have cold winters. Large areas in the Scandinavian mountains have alpine tundra climate.

The warmest temperature ever recorded in Scandinavia is 38.0 °C (100.4 °F) in Målilla (Sweden). The coldest temperature ever recorded is −52 °C (−62 °F) in Vuoggatjålme, Arjeplog (Sweden). The coldest month was February 1985 in Vittangi (Sweden) with a mean of −27.2 °C (−17.0 °F).

Southwesterly winds further warmed by foehn wind can give warm temperatures in narrow Norwegian fjords in winter. Tafjord has recorded 17.9 °C (64.2 °F) in January and Sunndal 18.9 °C (66.0 °F) in February.

== Scandinavia as a concept ==
=== Etymology ===
Scandinavia originally referred vaguely to Scania, a formerly Danish region that became Swedish in the 17th century.

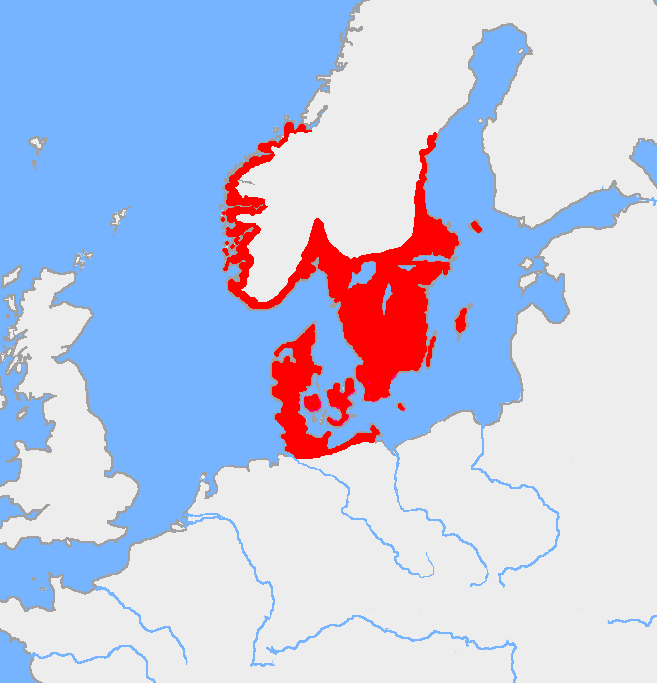
The original areas inhabited (during the Bronze Age) by the peoples now known as Scandinavians included what is now Northern Germany (particularly Schleswig-Holstein), all of Denmark, southern Sweden, the southern coast of Norway and Åland in Finland while namesake Scania found itself in the centre.

The words Scandinavia and Scania (Skåne, the southernmost province of Sweden) are both thought to go back to the Proto-Germanic compound *Skaðin-awjō, which appears later in Old English as Scedenig and in Old Norse as Skáney. The earliest identified source for the name Scandinavia is Pliny the Elder's Natural History, dated to the 1st century AD.

Various references to the region can also be found in Pytheas, Pomponius Mela, Tacitus, Ptolemy, Procopius and Jordanes, usually in the form of Scandza. It is believed that the name used by Pliny may be of West Germanic origin, originally denoting Scania. According to some scholars, the Germanic stem can be reconstructed as *skaðan-, meaning "danger" or "damage". The second segment of the name has been reconstructed as *awjō, meaning "land on the water" or "island". The name Scandinavia would then mean "dangerous island", which is considered to refer to the treacherous sandbanks surrounding Scania. Skanör in Scania, with its long Falsterbo reef, has the same stem (skan) combined with -ör, which means "sandbanks".

Alternatively, Sca(n)dinavia and Skáney, along with the Old Norse goddess name Skaði, may be related to Proto-Germanic *skaðwa- (meaning "shadow"). John McKinnell comments that this etymology suggests that the goddess Skaði may have once been a personification of the geographical region of Scandinavia or associated with the underworld.

Another possibility is that all or part of the segments of the name came from the pre-Germanic Mesolithic people inhabiting the region. In modernity, Scandinavia is a peninsula, but between approximately 10,300 and 9,500 years ago the southern part of Scandinavia was an island separated from the northern peninsula, with water exiting the Baltic Sea through the area where Stockholm is now located.

==== Appearance in medieval Germanic languages ====
The Latin names in Pliny's text gave rise to different forms in medieval Germanic texts. In Jordanes' history of the Goths (AD 551), the form Scandza is the name used for their original home, separated by sea from the land of Europe (chapter 1, 4). Where Jordanes meant to locate this quasi-legendary island is still a hotly debated issue, both in scholarly discussions and in the nationalistic discourse of various European countries. The form Scadinavia as the original home of the Langobards appears in Paul the Deacon' Historia Langobardorum, but in other versions of Historia Langobardorum appear the forms Scadan, Scandanan, Scadanan and Scatenauge. Frankish sources used Sconaowe and Aethelweard, an Anglo-Saxon historian, used Scani. In Beowulf, the forms Scedenige and Scedeland are used while the Alfredian translation of Orosius and Wulfstan's travel accounts used the Old English Sconeg.

==== Possible influence on Sámi languages ====
The earliest Sámi joik texts written down refer to the world as Skadesi-suolu in Northern Sámi and Skađsuâl in Skolt Sámi, meaning "Skaði's island". Svennung considers the Sámi name to have been introduced as a loanword from the North Germanic languages; "Skaði" is the jötunn stepmother of Freyr and Freyja in Norse mythology. It has been suggested that Skaði to some extent is modelled on a Sámi woman. The name for Skaði's father Þjazi is known in Sámi as Čáhci, "the waterman"; and her son with Odin, Sæmingr, can be interpreted as a descendant of Saam, the Sámi population. Older joik texts give evidence of the old Sámi belief about living on an island and state that the wolf is known as suolu gievra, meaning "the strong one on the island". The Sámi place name Sulliidčielbma means "the island's threshold" and Suoločielgi means "the island's back".

In recent substrate studies, Sámi linguists have examined the initial cluster sk- in words used in the Sámi languages and concluded that sk- is a phonotactic structure of non-Sámi origin.

=== Reintroduction of the term Scandinavia in the 18th century ===
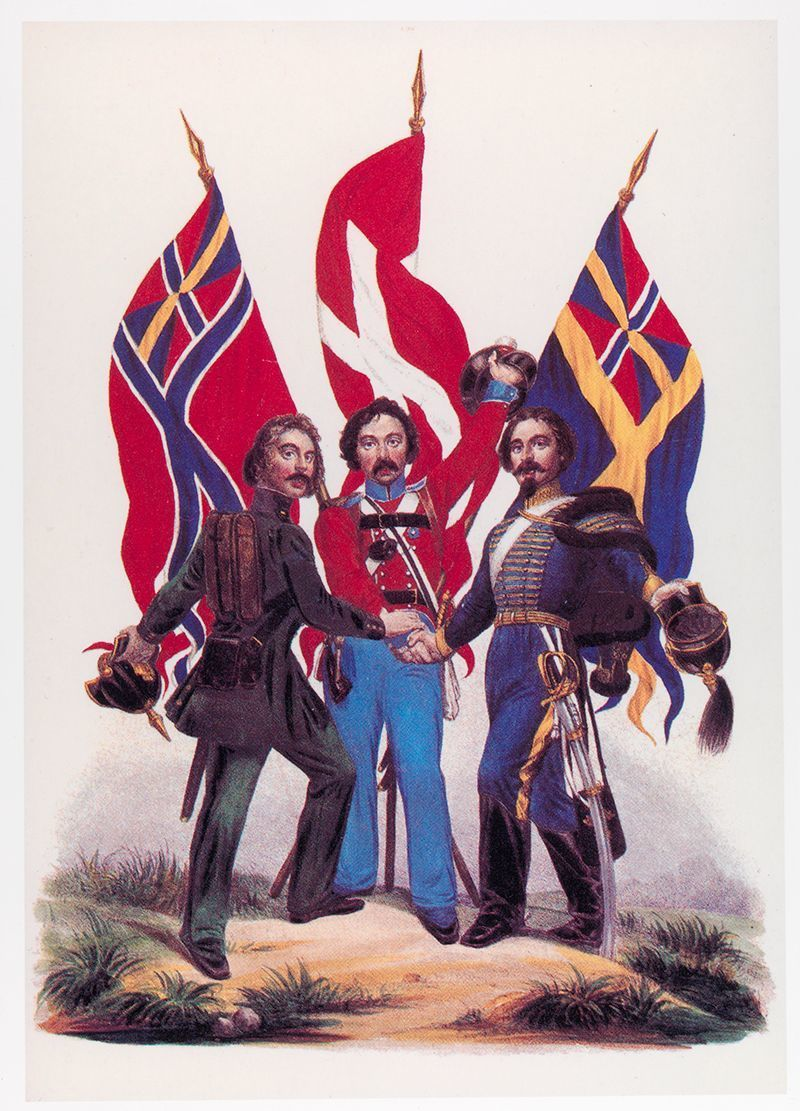
Scandinavism—a Norwegian, a Dane and a Swede

Although the term Scandinavia used by Pliny the Elder probably originated in the ancient Germanic languages, the modern form Scandinavia does not descend directly from the ancient Germanic term. Rather the word was brought into use in Europe by scholars borrowing the term from ancient sources like Pliny, and was used vaguely for Scania and the southern region of the peninsula.

The term was popularised by the linguistic and cultural Scandinavist movement, which asserted the common heritage and cultural unity of the Scandinavian countries and rose to prominence in the 1830s. The popular usage of the term in Sweden, Denmark and Norway as a unifying concept became established in the 19th century through poems such as Hans Christian Andersen's "I am a Scandinavian" of 1839. After a visit to Sweden, Andersen became a supporter of early political Scandinavism. In a letter describing the poem to a friend, he wrote: "All at once I understood how related the Swedes, the Danes and the Norwegians are, and with this feeling I wrote the poem immediately after my return: 'We are one people, we are called Scandinavians!'".

The influence of Scandinavism as a Scandinavist political movement peaked in the middle of the 19th century, between the First Schleswig War (1848–1850) and the Second Schleswig War (1864).

Charles XV, king of Sweden, also proposed a unification of Denmark, Norway and Sweden into a single united kingdom. The background for the proposal was the tumultuous events during the Napoleonic Wars in the beginning of the century. This war resulted in Finland (formerly the eastern third of Sweden) becoming the Russian Grand Duchy of Finland in 1809 and Norway (de jure in union with Denmark since 1387, although de facto treated as a province) becoming independent in 1814, but thereafter swiftly forced to accept a personal union with Sweden. The dependent territories Iceland, the Faroe Islands and Greenland, historically part of Norway, remained with Denmark in accordance with the Treaty of Kiel. Sweden and Norway were thus united under the Swedish monarch, but Finland's inclusion in the Russian Empire excluded any possibility for a political union between Finland and any of the other Nordic countries.

The end of the Scandinavian political movement came when Denmark was denied the military support promised from Sweden and Norway to annex the (Danish) Duchy of Schleswig, which together with the (German) Duchy of Holstein had been in personal union with Denmark. The Second war of Schleswig followed in 1864, a brief but disastrous war between Denmark and Prussia (supported by Austria). Schleswig-Holstein was conquered by Prussia and after Prussia's success in the Franco-Prussian War a Prussian-led German Empire was created and a new power-balance in the Baltic region was established. The Scandinavian Monetary Union, established in 1873, lasted until World War I.

=== Use of Nordic countries vs. Scandinavia ===
Scandinavia according to the local definition The extended usage in English, which includes Iceland and the Faroe Islands, Åland and Finland

The term Scandinavia (sometimes specified in English as Continental Scandinavia or mainland Scandinavia) is ordinarily used locally for Denmark, Norway and Sweden as a subset of the Nordic countries (known in Norwegian, Danish, and Swedish as Norden; Finnish: Pohjoismaat, Icelandic: Norðurlöndin, Faroese: Norðurlond).

However, in English usage, the term Scandinavia is sometimes used as a synonym or near-synonym for what are known locally as Nordic countries.

Usage in English is different from usage in the Scandinavian languages themselves (which use Scandinavia in the narrow meaning), and by the fact that the question of whether a country belongs to Scandinavia is politicised. People from the Nordic world beyond Norway, Denmark and Sweden may be offended at being either included in or excluded from the category of "Scandinavia".

Nordic countries is used unambiguously for Denmark, Norway, Sweden, Finland and Iceland, including their associated territories Greenland, the Faroe Islands and the Åland Islands.

The geological term Fennoscandia refers to the Fennoscandian Shield (or Baltic Shield), which includes the Scandinavian Peninsula, Finland and Karelia, and excludes Denmark and other parts of the wider Nordic world. The term Fennoscandia is sometimes used in a political sense to refer to Norway, Sweden, Denmark, and Finland.

==== Different meanings of the term Scandinavian ====
The term Scandinavian may be used with two principal meanings, in an ethnic or cultural sense and as a modern and more inclusive demonym.

In the ethnic or cultural sense, the term Scandinavian traditionally refers to speakers of Scandinavian languages, who are mainly descendants of the peoples historically known as Norsemen. In this sense the term refers primarily to native Danes, Norwegians and Swedes as well as descendants of Scandinavian settlers such as the Icelanders and the Faroese. The term is also used in this ethnic sense, to refer to the modern descendants of the Norse, in studies of linguistics and culture.

Additionally the term Scandinavian is used demonymically to refer to all modern inhabitants or citizens of Scandinavian countries. Within Scandinavia the demonymic term primarily refers to inhabitants or citizens of Denmark, Norway and Sweden. In English usage inhabitants or citizens of Iceland, the Faroe Islands and Finland are sometimes included as well. English general dictionaries often define the noun Scandinavian demonymically as meaning any inhabitant of Scandinavia (which might be narrowly conceived or broadly conceived).

There is a certain ambiguity and political contestation as to which peoples should be referred to as Scandinavian in this broader sense. Sámi people who live in Norway and Sweden are generally included as Scandinavians in the demonymic sense; the Sámi of Finland may be included in English usage, but usually not in local usage; the Sámi of Russia are not included. However, the use of the term "Scandinavian" with reference to the Sámi is complicated by the historical attempts by Scandinavian majority peoples and governments in Norway and Sweden to assimilate the Sámi people into the Scandinavian culture and languages, making the inclusion of the Sámi as "Scandinavians" controversial among many Sámi. Modern Sámi politicians and organizations often stress the status of the Sámi as a people separate from and equal to the Scandinavians, with their own language and culture, and are apprehensive about being included as "Scandinavians" in light of earlier Scandinavian assimilation policies.

== Languages ==
Two language groups have coexisted in Scandinavia since prehistory—the North Germanic languages (Scandinavian languages) and the Uralic languages, Sámi and Finnish.

Most people in Scandinavia today speak Scandinavian languages that evolved from Old Norse, originally spoken by ancient Germanic tribes in southern Scandinavia. The Continental Scandinavian languages—Danish, Norwegian and Swedish—form a dialect continuum and are considered mutually intelligible. The Insular Scandinavian languages—Faroese and Icelandic—on the other hand, are only partially intelligible to speakers of the continental Scandinavian languages.

The Uralic languages are linguistically unrelated to the Scandinavian languages. Finnish is the majority language in Finland, and a recognized minority language in Sweden. Meänkieli and Kven, sometimes considered as dialects of Finnish, are recognized minority languages in Sweden and Norway, respectively. The Sámi languages are indigenous minority languages in Scandinavia, spoken by the Sámi people in northern Scandinavia.

=== North Germanic languages ===
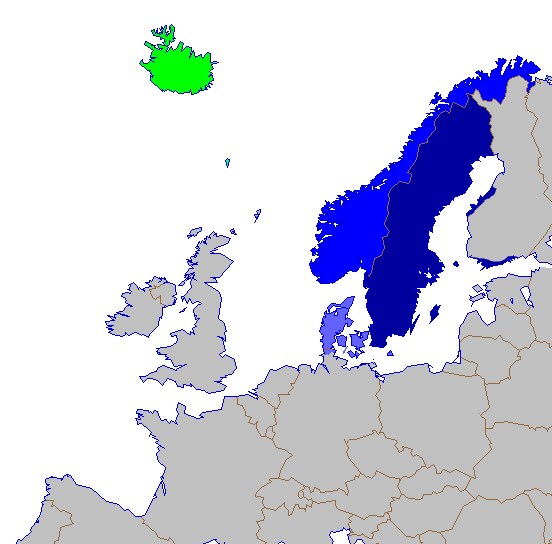
Continental Scandinavian languages: Danish Norwegian Swedish Insular Scandinavian languages: Faroese Icelandic

The North Germanic languages of Scandinavia are traditionally divided into an East Scandinavian branch (Danish and Swedish) and a West Scandinavian branch (Norwegian, Icelandic and Faroese), but because of changes appearing in the languages since 1600 the East Scandinavian and West Scandinavian branches are now usually reconfigured into Insular Scandinavian (ö-nordisk/øy-nordisk) featuring Icelandic and Faroese and Continental Scandinavian (Skandinavisk), comprising Danish, Norwegian and Swedish.

The modern division is based on the degree of mutual comprehensibility between the languages in the two branches. The populations of the Scandinavian countries, with common Scandinavian roots in language, can—at least with some training—understand each other's standard languages as they appear in print and are heard on radio and television.

The reason Danish, Swedish and the two official written versions of Norwegian (Nynorsk and Bokmål) are traditionally viewed as different languages, rather than dialects of one common language, is that each is a well-established standard language in its respective country.

Danish, Swedish and Norwegian have since medieval times been influenced to varying degrees by Middle Low German and standard German. That influence was due not only to proximity, but also to the rule of Denmark—and later Denmark-Norway—over the German-speaking region of Holstein, and to Sweden's close trade with the Hanseatic League.

Norwegians are accustomed to variation and may perceive Danish and Swedish only as slightly more distant dialects. This is because they have two official written standards, in addition to the habit of strongly holding on to local dialects. The people of Stockholm, Sweden and Copenhagen, Denmark have the greatest difficulty in understanding other Scandinavian languages. In the Faroe Islands and Iceland, learning Danish is mandatory. This causes Faroese people as well as Icelandic people to become bilingual in two very distinct North Germanic languages, making it relatively easy for them to understand the other two Mainland Scandinavian languages.

Although Iceland was under the political control of Denmark until a much later date (1918), very little influence and borrowing from Danish has occurred in the Icelandic language. Icelandic remained the preferred language among the ruling classes in Iceland. Danish was not used for official communications, most of the royal officials were of Icelandic descent and the language of the church and law courts remained Icelandic.

Finland has a Swedish-speaking minority which constitutes approximately 5% of the total population. The Swedish-speakers live mainly on the coastline starting from approximately the city of Porvoo (Sw: Borgå) (in the Gulf of Finland) up to the city of Kokkola (Sw: Karleby) (in the Bay of Bothnia). The coastal region of Ostrobothnia has a Swedish-speaking majority, whereas plenty of areas on this coastline are nearly unilingually Finnish, like the region of Satakunta. Swedish spoken in today's Finland includes a lot of words that are borrowed from Finnish, whereas the written language remains closer to that of Sweden. Åland, an autonomous region of Finland situated in the archipelago between Finland and Sweden, is entirely Swedish-speaking.

=== Uralic languages ===
The Scandinavian languages are (as a language family) unrelated to Finnish and the Sámi languages, which as Uralic languages are distantly related to each other. Owing to the close proximity, there is a great deal of borrowing from the Swedish and Norwegian languages in Finnish and Sámi.

==== Finnish ====
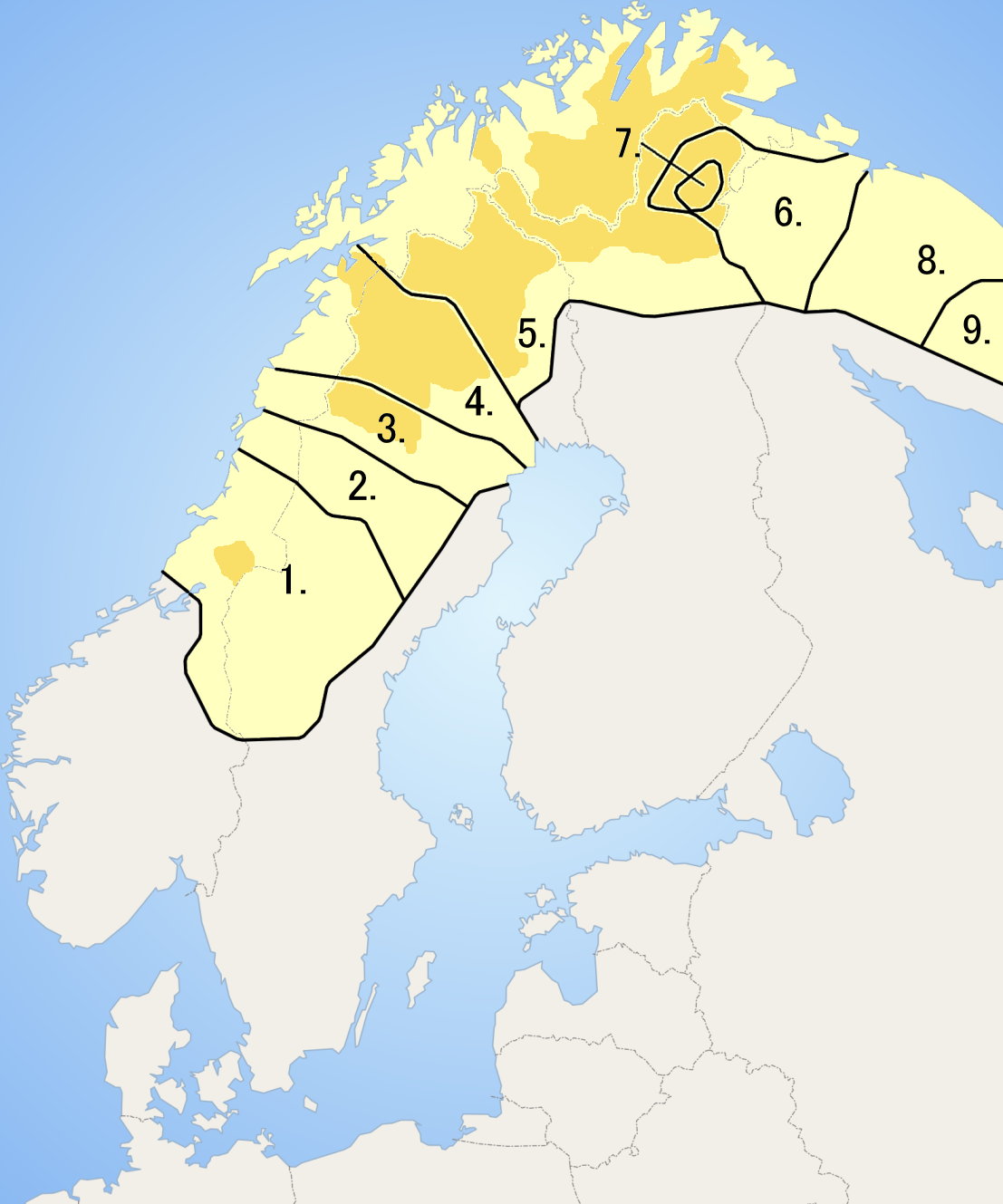
Historically verified distribution of the Sámi languages

Finnish is the majority language of Finland, spoken by 95% of the population. Swedish has had a strong influence on Finnish because it served as the dominant administrative and cultural language during the centuries when Finland belonged to the Swedish realm, and it retained a strong position during the subsequent Russian period. Finnish-speakers often needed to learn Swedish in order to pursue higher-status positions.

Finland is officially bilingual: Finnish and Swedish are both national languages, with equal legal status. Children are taught the other official language at school: for Swedish-speakers this is Finnish (usually from the 3rd grade), while for Finnish-speakers it is Swedish (usually from the 3rd, 5th or 7th grade).

Finnish speakers constitute a language minority in both Sweden and Norway. Meänkieli and Kven are Finnish dialects mainly spoken in the Swedish part of the Torne Valley and surrounding areas, and in the Norwegian counties of Troms and Finnmark, respectively. Meänkieli has held an official status as a minority language in Sweden since 2000, and Kven in Norway since 2005.

Karelian is a language closely related to Finnish. In Finland, it has an official status as a non-territorial minority language within the framework of the European Charter for Regional or Minority Languages.

==== Sámi languages ====
The Sámi languages are indigenous minority languages in Scandinavia. They belong to their own branch of the Uralic language family and are unrelated to the North Germanic languages other than by limited grammatical (particularly lexical) characteristics resulting from prolonged contact. Sámi is divided into several languages or dialects. Consonant gradation is a feature in both Finnish and northern Sámi dialects, but it is not present in southern Sámi, which is considered to have a different language history. According to the Sámi Information Centre of the Sámi Parliament of Sweden, southern Sámi may have originated in an earlier migration from the south into the Scandinavian Peninsula.

=== Other languages ===
German is a recognized minority language in Denmark. Yiddish, Romani Chib/Romanes, Scandoromani are amongst the languages protected in parts of Scandinavia under the European Charter for Regional or Minority Languages. Recent migration has added even more languages.

== History ==
=== Ancient descriptions ===
A key ancient description of Scandinavia was provided by Pliny the Elder, though his mentions of Scatinavia and surrounding areas are not always easy to decipher. Writing in the capacity of a Roman admiral, he introduces the northern region by declaring to his Roman readers that there are 23 islands "Romanis armis cognitae" ("known to Roman arms") in this area. According to Pliny, the "clarissima" ("most famous") of the region's islands is Scatinavia, of unknown size. There live the Hilleviones. The belief that Scandinavia was an island became widespread among classical authors during the 1st century and dominated descriptions of Scandinavia in classical texts during the centuries that followed.

Pliny begins his description of the route to Scatinavia by referring to the mountain of Saevo (mons Saevo ibi), the Codanus Bay ("Codanus sinus") and the Cimbrian promontory. The geographical features have been identified in various ways. By some scholars, Saevo is thought to be the mountainous Norwegian coast at the entrance to Skagerrak and the Cimbrian peninsula is thought to be Skagen, the north tip of Jutland, Denmark. As described, Saevo and Scatinavia can also be the same place.

Pliny mentions Scandinavia one more time: in Book VIII he says that the animal called achlis (given in the accusative, achlin, which is not Latin) was born on the island of Scandinavia. The animal grazes, has a big upper lip and some mythical attributes.

The name Scandia, later used as a synonym for Scandinavia, also appears in Pliny's Naturalis Historia (Natural History), but is used for a group of Northern European islands which he locates north of Britannia. Scandia thus does not appear to be denoting the island Scadinavia in Pliny's text. The idea that Scadinavia may have been one of the Scandiae islands was instead introduced by Ptolemy (c. 90 – c. 168 AD), a mathematician, geographer and astrologer of Roman Egypt. He used the name Skandia for the biggest, most easterly of the three Scandiai islands, which according to him were all located east of Jutland.

=== Viking Age ===
The Viking age in Scandinavia lasted from approximately 793–1066 AD and saw Scandinavians participate in large scale raiding, colonization, conquest and trading throughout Europe and beyond. The period saw a big expansion of Scandinavian-conquered territory and of exploration. Utilizing their advanced longships, they reached as far as North America, being the first Europeans to do so. During this time Scandinavians were drawn to wealthy towns, monasteries and petty kingdoms overseas in places such as the British Isles, Ireland, the Baltic coast and Normandy, all of which made profitable targets for raids. Scandinavians, primarily from modern day Sweden, known as Varangians also ventured east into what is now Russia raiding along river trade routes. During this period unification also took place between different Scandinavian kingdoms culminating in the peak of the North Sea Empire which included large parts of Scandinavia and Great Britain.

This expansion and conquest led to the formation of several kingdoms, earldoms and settlements throughout Europe such as the Kingdom of the Isles, Earldom of Orkney, Scandinavian York, Danelaw, Kingdom of Dublin, the Duchy of Normandy and the Kievan Rus'. The Faroe Islands, Iceland and Greenland were also settled by the Scandinavians during this time. The Normans, Rus' people, Faroe Islanders, Icelanders and Norse-Gaels all emerged from these Scandinavian expansions.

=== The Middle Ages ===
During a period of Christianization and state formation in the 10th–13th centuries, numerous Germanic petty kingdoms and chiefdoms were unified into three kingdoms:

- Denmark, forged from the lands of Denmark (including Jutland, Zealand and Scania (Skåneland) on the Scandinavian Peninsula)
- Sweden, forged from the lands of Sweden on the Scandinavian Peninsula (including most of modern Finland, but excluding the provinces Bohuslän, Härjedalen, Jämtland and Idre and Särna, Halland, Blekinge and Scania of modern-day Sweden)
- Norway (including Bohuslän, Härjedalen, Jämtland and Idre and Särna on the Scandinavian Peninsula and its island colonies Iceland, Greenland, Faroe Islands, Shetland, Orkney, Isle of Man and the Hebrides)

According to historian Sverre Bagge, the division into three Scandinavian kingdoms (Denmark, Sweden, Norway) makes sense geographically, as forests, mountains, and uninhabited land divided them from one another. Control of Norway was enabled through seapower, whereas control of the great lakes in Sweden enabled control of the kingdom, and control of Jutland was sufficient to control Denmark. The most contested area was the coastline from Oslo to Öresund, where the three kingdoms met.

The three Scandinavian kingdoms joined in 1397 in the Kalmar Union under Queen Margaret I of Denmark. Sweden left the union in 1523 under King Gustav I of Sweden. In the aftermath of Sweden's secession from the Kalmar Union, civil war broke out in Denmark and Norway—the Protestant Reformation followed. When things had settled, the Norwegian privy council was abolished—it assembled for the last time in 1537. A personal union, entered into by the kingdoms of Denmark and Norway in 1536, lasted until 1814. Three sovereign successor states have subsequently emerged from this unequal union: Denmark, Norway and Iceland.

The borders between Denmark, Norway and Sweden acquired their present shape in the middle of the 17th century: In the 1645 Treaty of Brömsebro, Denmark–Norway ceded the Norwegian provinces of Jämtland, Härjedalen and Idre and Särna, as well as the Baltic Sea islands of Gotland and Ösel (in Estonia) to Sweden. The Treaty of Roskilde, signed in 1658, forced Denmark–Norway to cede the Danish provinces Scania, Blekinge, Halland, Bornholm and the Norwegian provinces of Båhuslen and Trøndelag to Sweden. The 1660 Treaty of Copenhagen forced Sweden to return Bornholm and Trøndelag to Denmark–Norway, and to give up its recent claims to the island Funen.

In the east, Finland was a fully incorporated part of Sweden from medieval times until the Napoleonic wars, when it was ceded to Russia. Despite many wars over the years since the formation of the three kingdoms, Scandinavia has been politically and culturally close.

=== Scandinavian unions ===
The Kalmar Union (c. 1400)

Denmark–Norway as a historiographical name refers to the former political union consisting of the kingdoms of Denmark and Norway, including the Norwegian dependencies of Iceland, Greenland and the Faroe Islands. The corresponding adjective and demonym is Dano-Norwegian. During Danish rule, Norway kept its separate laws, coinage and army as well as some institutions such as a royal chancellor. Norway's old royal line had died out with the death of Olav IV in 1387, but Norway's remaining a hereditary kingdom became an important factor for the Oldenburg dynasty of Denmark–Norway in its struggles to win elections as kings of Denmark.

The Treaty of Kiel (14 January 1814) formally dissolved the Dano-Norwegian union and ceded the territory of Norway proper to the King of Sweden, but Denmark retained Norway's overseas possessions. However, widespread Norwegian resistance to the prospect of a union with Sweden induced the governor of Norway, crown prince Christian Frederick (later Christian VIII of Denmark), to call a constituent assembly at Eidsvoll in April 1814. The assembly drew up a liberal constitution and elected Christian Frederick to the throne of Norway. Following a Swedish invasion during the summer, the peace conditions of the Convention of Moss (14 August 1814) specified that king Christian Frederik had to resign, but Norway would keep its independence and its constitution within a personal union with Sweden. Christian Frederik formally abdicated on 10 August 1814 and returned to Denmark. The Norwegian parliament Storting elected king Charles XIII of Sweden as king of Norway on 4 November.

The Storting dissolved the union between Sweden and Norway in 1905, after which the Norwegians elected Prince Charles of Denmark as king of Norway: he reigned as Haakon VII.

== Economy ==
Measured in per capita GDP, the Nordic countries are among the richest in the world. There is a generous welfare system in Denmark, Finland, Iceland, Norway and Sweden. These economies have been marked by large public sectors, extensive and generous welfare systems, a high level of taxation and considerable state involvement.

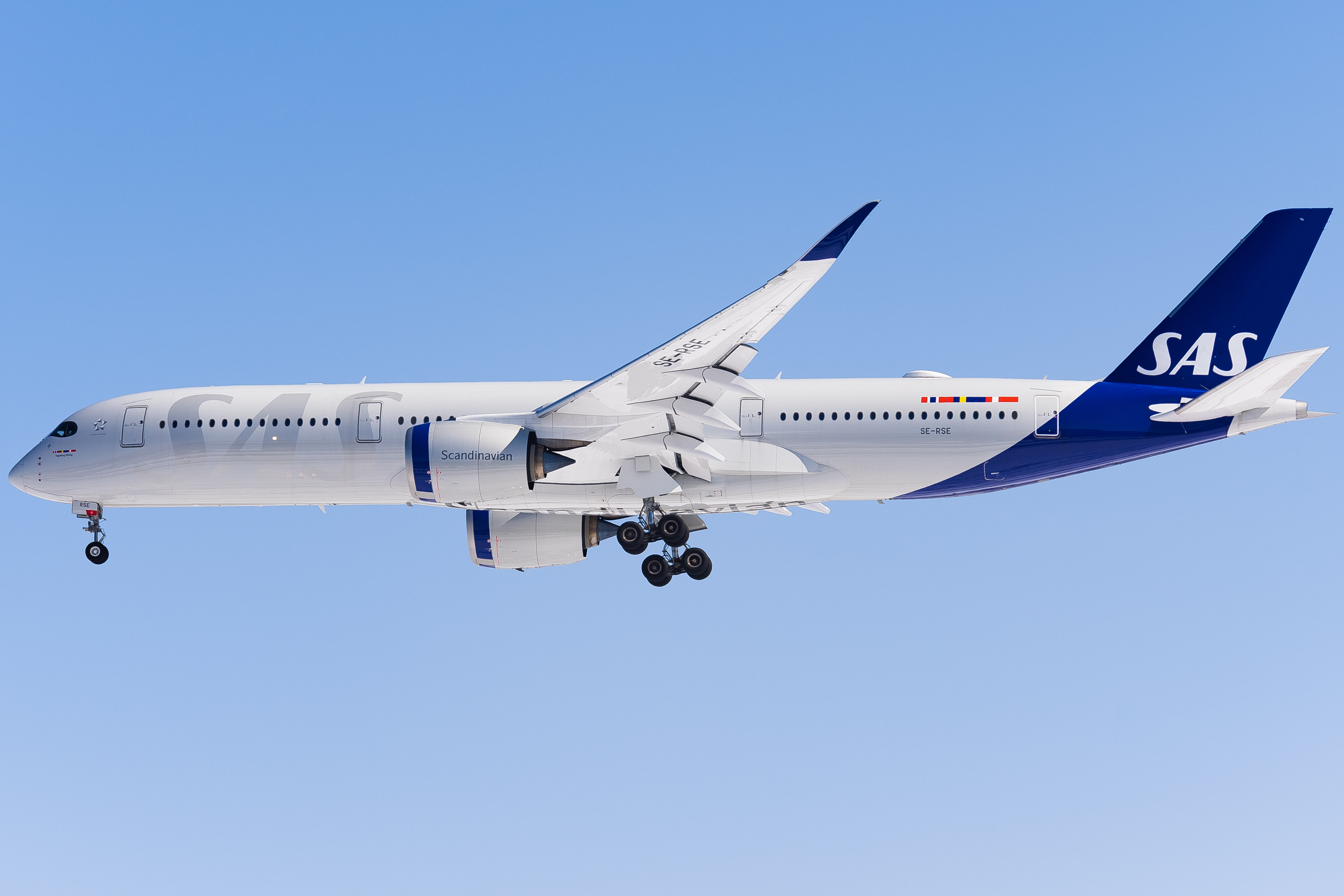
Scandinavian Airlines (SAS) is the joint flag carrier of Denmark, Norway and Sweden.

=== Tourism ===
Various promotional agencies of the Nordic countries such as the Norwegian Trekking Association, the Swedish Tourist Association, and in the United States (The American-Scandinavian Foundation established in 1910 by the Danish American industrialist Niels Poulsen) serve to promote market and tourism interests in the region. Today, the five Nordic heads of state act as the organization's patrons and according to the official statement by the organization its mission is "to promote the Nordic region as a whole while increasing the visibility of Denmark, Finland, Iceland, Norway and Sweden in New York City and the United States". The official tourist boards of Scandinavia sometimes cooperate under one umbrella, such as the Scandinavian Tourist Board. The cooperation was introduced for the Asian market in 1986, when the Swedish national tourist board joined the Danish national tourist board to coordinate intergovernmental promotion of the two countries. Norway's government entered one year later. All five Nordic governments participate in the joint promotional efforts in the United States through the Scandinavian Tourist Board of North America.

== See also ==
- Baltic region
- Baltoscandia
- Denmark–Norway relations
- Denmark–Sweden relations
- Norway–Sweden relations
- Fennoscandia
- Kvenland
- Sápmi
- Nordic countries
- Nordic cross flag
- Nordic Council
- Nordic folklore
- Scandinavian colonialism
- Scandinavian family name etymology
- Scandza
- Vikings
