= Eggþér =

Norse mythical character

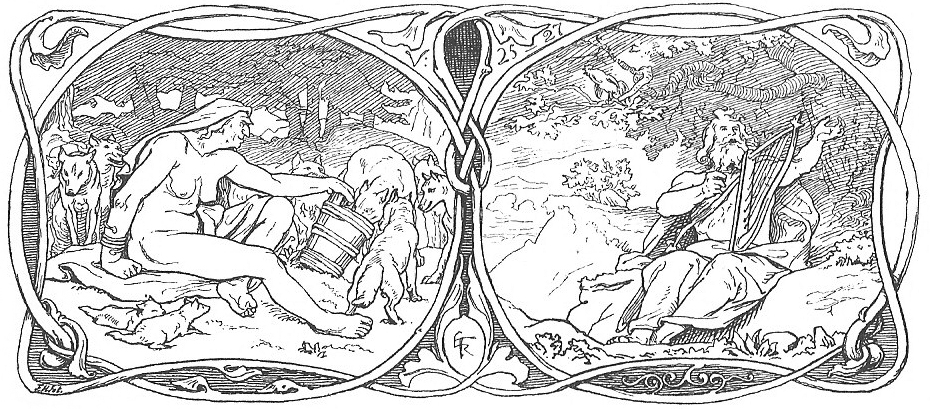
Illustration by Lorenz Frølich: Eggþér and Fjalar on the right, Járnviðr on the left

Eggþér (also Eggthér, or Egdir; Old Norse: [ˈeɡːˌθeːz̠], 'Edge-Servant') is a jötunn in Norse mythology. He is the herder of the female jötunn (probably Angrboða) who lives in Járnviðr (Ironwood) and raises monstrous wolves. In the poem Völuspá, Eggþér is described as sitting on a mound and joyfully striking his harp while the red rooster Fjalarr begins to crow to herald the onset of Ragnarök.

== Name ==
The Old Norse name Eggþér ('edge-servant') is a compound formed with the word egg ('edge') attached to -þér ('servant'). It has been interpreted as meaning 'bearer of a sword', 'one who is servant of the sword', or 'one who has servants armed with knives', possibly denoting 'one who provides victims for battle'.

Eggþér is cognate with the Old English personal name Ecgþéow, borne by the father of Beowulf in Old English poetry, and with the Old High German name Eggideo (or Eckideo). It is also found as a personal name in Old Norse Egdir. They may stem from a common Proto-Germanic form reconstructed as *Agjō-þe(g)waz.

According to Peter H. Salus and Paul B. Taylor, the Old Norse Eggþér ('Edge-Servant') is a descriptive agnomen derived from his function as the one who would rouse the jötnar and wolves to battle during Ragnarök. They argue that there is a "remote similarity" with Ecgþéow, since the latter was also known for the feuds he have brought about by his fighting. Both names could embody, in their respective tradition, the role of arousers of great battles and feuds. Andy Orchard and John Lindow contend however that a mythological parallel between the two figures is most likely a "red herring".

== Attestation ==
Eggþér is mentioned in the poem Völuspá (Prophecy of the Völva) as the herder of the jötunn living in Járnviðr (Ironwood) and raising "the kinfolk of Fenrir" (wolves). While the red rooster Fjalarr is heralding the onset of Ragnarök, Eggþér is portrayed as joyfully striking his harp.

Völuspá 42: Sat þar á haugi ok sló hörpu gýgjar hirðir glaðr Egðir; gól um hánum í gaglviði fagrrauðr hani, sá er Fjalarr heitir.	Salus & Taylor translation (1969): The giantesses' herder, joyful Eggthér, sits on his cairn and strikes the harp; the red cock, called All-Wise, crows to him from Birdwood.	C. Larrington translation (1995): He sat on the mound and plucked his harp the herdsman of the giantess, cheerful Eggther a rooster crowed in Gallows-wood that bright-red cockerel who is called Fialar

== Theories ==
Scholar Andy Orchard notes that the scene of Ragnarök has a "curious echo" in the Icelandic Njáls saga, where the hero Gunnar is portrayed as singing joyfully within his own burial mound.

The identity of the gýgr mentioned in the poem is unclear. According to scholars, she is probably the one described in stanza 40 of the same poem, a figure possibly identified with the jötunn Angrboða. She is said to dwell in the forest of Járnviðr (Ironwood), where she raises the offspring of the wolf Fenrir. Salus and Taylor contend that the herdsman Eggþér is not a shepherd, but rather a wolf-herder. In this view, Eggþér is portrayed as 'joyful' or 'cheerful' in Völuspá because the "rearing of the wolves will bring about the downfall of the gods", and he is striking his harp to "arouse his charge to ferocious deeds".

== Legacy ==
Saturn's moon Eggther is named after him.
