= Eggther (moon) =

Moon of Saturn

Discovery
- Discovered by: Sheppard et al.
- Discovery date: 2019

Designations
- Pronunciation: /ˈɛɡθɛər/
- Named after: Eggþér
- Alternative names: Saturn LIX; S/2004 S 27; S8576a

Orbital characteristics
- Semi-major axis: 19776700 km
- Eccentricity: 0.120
- Orbital period (sidereal): −1033.0 days
- Inclination: 167.1°
- Satellite of: Saturn
- Group: Norse group

Physical characteristics
- Mean diameter: 6 km
- Apparent magnitude: 24.5

Eggther (Saturn LIX), provisionally known as S/2004 S 27, is a natural satellite of Saturn. Its discovery was announced by Scott S. Sheppard, David C. Jewitt, and Jan Kleyna on October 7, 2019 from observations taken between December 12, 2004 and March 21, 2007. It was given its permanent designation in August 2021. On 24 August 2022, it was officially named after Eggþér, a jötunn from Norse mythology. He is the herder of the female jötunn (probably Angrboða) who lives in Járnviðr (Ironwood) and raises monstrous wolves. In the poem Völuspá, Eggþér is described as sitting on a mound and joyfully striking his harp while the red rooster Fjalarr begins to crow to herald the onset of Ragnarök.

Eggther is about 6 kilometres in diameter, and orbits Saturn at an average distance of 19.976 million km in 1054.45 days, at an inclination of 168° to the ecliptic, in a retrograde direction and with an eccentricity of 0.122.
