= Fjalar (rooster) =

Norse mythical character

Fjalar (Old Norse: Fjalarr [ˈfjɑlɑrː], "deceiver") is the mythical red rooster that is said to herald the onset of Ragnarök in Norse mythology.

== Name ==
The Old Norse name Fjalarr has been translated as 'deceiver' or 'hider'. It probably derives from an earlier Proto-Norse form reconstructed as *felaraʀ.

Three other unrelated figures bear the name Fjalar in Norse mythology. It is an alias of Suttungr in the Hávamál ('Sayings of the High One') version of Odin's theft of the mead of poetry. Fjalar is also the name of one of the dwarfs who made the mead of poetry from the blood of Kvasir in Skáldskaparmál ('The Language of Poetry'). Finally, in Hárbarðsljóð ('The Lay of Hárbarðr'), the jötunn who succeeded in deceiving Thor is also named Fjalar. In Snorri's version of the Thor's journey, however, the jötunn is named Skrymir.

Peter H. Salus and Paul B. Taylor argue that "of these four, probably only one (the dwarf) is actually named Fjalar, the cock and the two giants are called Fjalar because of their cunning."

== Attestation ==
In Völuspá (Prophecy of the Völva), Fjalar is portrayed as a beautiful red rooster who crows the onset of Ragnarök, sitting near the herdsman Eggþér who is joyfully striking his harp.

Völuspá 42: Sat þar á haugi ok sló hörpu gýgjar hirðir glaðr Egðir; gól um hánum í gaglviði fagrrauðr hani, sá er Fjalarr heitir.	C. Larrington translation (1995): He sat on the mound and plucked his harp the herdsman of the giantess, cheerful Eggther a rooster crowed in Gallows-wood that bright-red cockerel who is called Fialar
