= Sæmingr =

Nordic mythology character

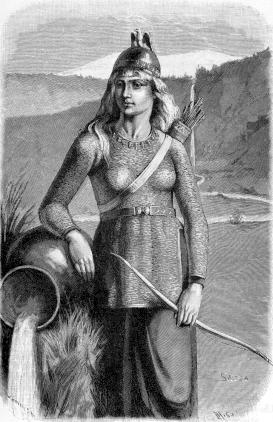

In Norse mythology, Sæmingr was a legendary king of Norway (specifically the province of Hålogaland). He serves as the legendary ancestor for the jarls of Hlaðir.

== Attestations ==
=== Háleygjatal ===
The earliest attestation of Sæmingr is the poem Háleygjatal, composed by Eyvindr skáldaspillir in the 10th century. However, this text only survives in fragmentary quotations embedded in later prose sources.

Sæmingr is mentioned twice in Snorri Sturluson’s saga-cycle the Heimskringla. In the prologue, it is said that Háleygjatal attests that he was the son of Yngvifreyr, but no citation is given. However, in the following Ynglinga saga, Snorri quotes the following stanza from Háleygjatal as support for Sæmingr being the son of Odin and Skadi:

Þann skjaldblœtr skattfœri gat Ása niðr við járnviðju, þás þau mær í manheimum skatna vinr ok Skaði byggðu, sævar beins, ok sunu marga ǫndurdís við Óðni gat. — Russell Poole 2012	‘The shield-worshipped kinsman of the Æsir gods begat that tribute-bringer Sæmingr with the female from Járnviðr, when those renowned ones, the friend of warriors, Óðinn and Skaði, a giantess, lived in the lands of the maiden of the bone of the sea (lit. ‘maiden-lands of the bone of the sea’) Jǫtunheimar ‘Giant-lands’], and the ski-goddess Skaði bore many sons with Óðinn.’

The stanza is followed by the comment that Hákon jarl reckoned his lineage back to Sæmingr.

=== Prose Edda ===
According to the prologue of the Prose Edda, Sæmingr was one of the sons of Odin and the ancestor of the kings of Norway and the jarls of Hlaðir. Snorri relates that Odin settled in Sweden and:

After that he went into the north, until he was stopped by the sea, which men thought lay around all the lands of the earth; and there he set his son over this kingdom, which is now called Norway. This king was Sæmingr; the kings of Norway trace their lineage from him, and so do also the jarls and the other mighty men, as is said in the Háleygjatal.

— Prologue of the Prose Edda (11) Brodeur's translation

Sæmingr is also listed among the sons of Odin in the þulur.

=== Later sources ===
The late Saga of Hálfdan Eysteinsson also reports that Sæmingr was Odin's son. The saga adds that he reigned over Hålogaland. He married Nauma and had a son called Þrándr.

A Swedish king by the name Semingr (likely the very same name as the Norwegian king of Folklore in an alternate rendering) becomes victim to a draugr who wields a legendary sword in The Saga of Hromund Gripsson. A similar name, "Sámr", appears related to characters in both Hrafnkels saga and Njáls saga.
