= Denmark–Norway relations =

- Denmark: Norway

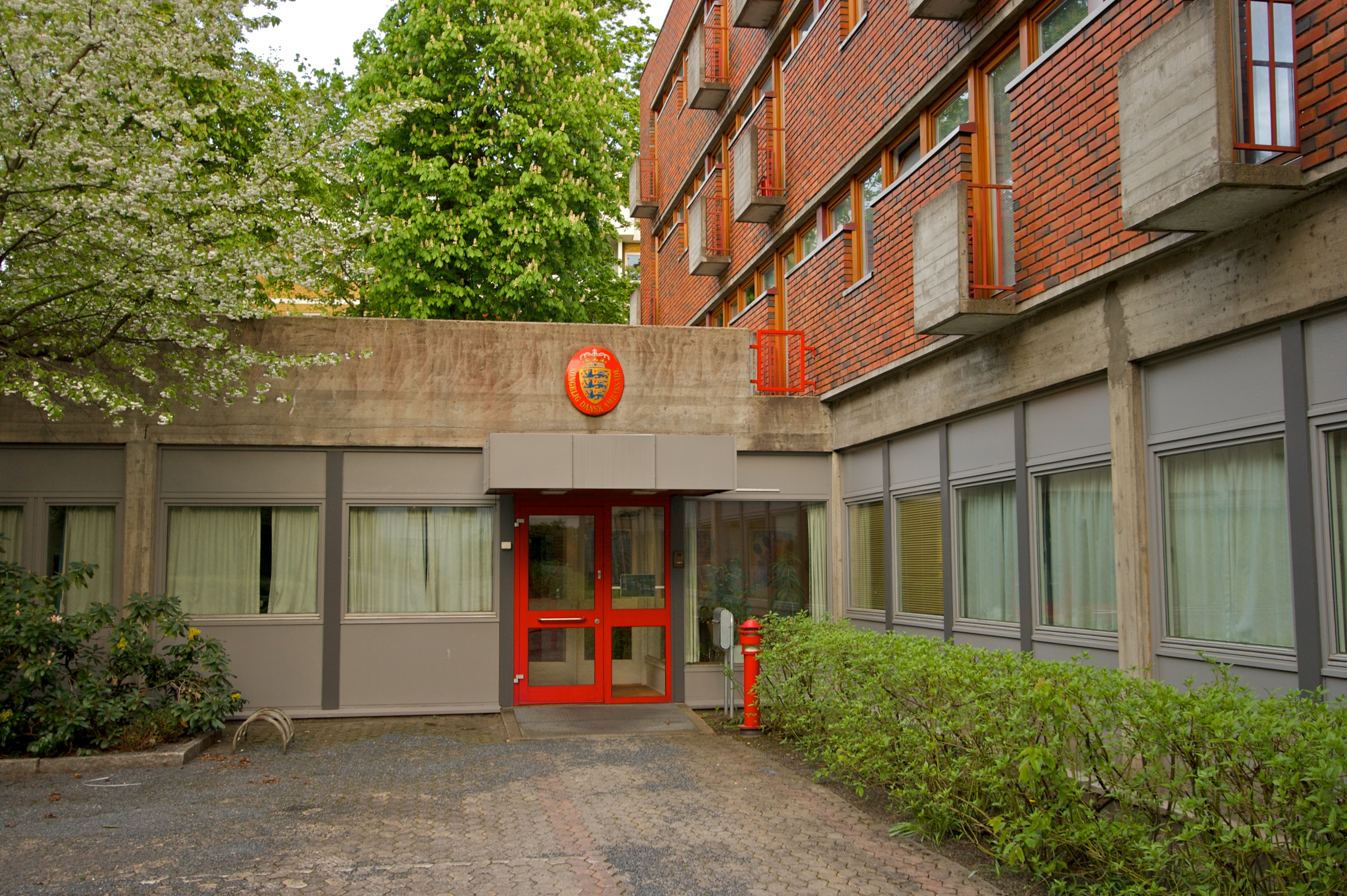
Embassy of Denmark in Oslo

Denmark and Norway have a very long history together: they were both part of the Kalmar Union between 1397 and 1523, and Norway was in a Union with Denmark between 1524 and 1814.

The two countries established diplomatic relations in 1905, after Norway ended its union with Sweden. Denmark has an embassy in Oslo and Norway has an embassy in Copenhagen.

Both countries are full members of the Nordic Council, Council of the Baltic Sea States, NATO, OECD, OSCE, Arctic Council, Council of Europe and the World Trade Organization. There are around 15,000 Norwegians living in Denmark and around 20,000 Danes living in Norway.

== Early history ==
Relations date back to the Middle Ages, when both countries were first established in the 8th-9th century. Denmark took part in the Battle of Svolder against Norway in 999 or 1000, and in the following partition of Norway.

Denmark and Norway alongside England formed part of the North Sea Empire from 1013 to 1042.

== Kalmar Union ==
The Kalmar Union is a historiographical term meaning a series of personal unions that united the three kingdoms of Denmark, Norway (with Iceland, Greenland, Faroe Islands, Shetland, and Orkney), and Sweden (including Finland) under a single monarch, though intermittently and with a population less than 3,000,000.

The countries had not technically given up their sovereignty, nor their independence, but in practical terms, they were not autonomous, the common monarch holding the sovereignty and, particularly, leading foreign policy; diverging interests (especially the Swedish nobility's dissatisfaction over the dominant role played by Denmark and Holstein) gave rise to a conflict that would hamper the union in several intervals from the 1430s until the union's breakup in 1523 when Gustav Vasa became king of Sweden.

Norway and its overseas dependencies, however, continued to remain a part of the realm of Denmark–Norway under the Oldenburg dynasty for several centuries until its dissolution in 1814.

== Denmark–Norway ==
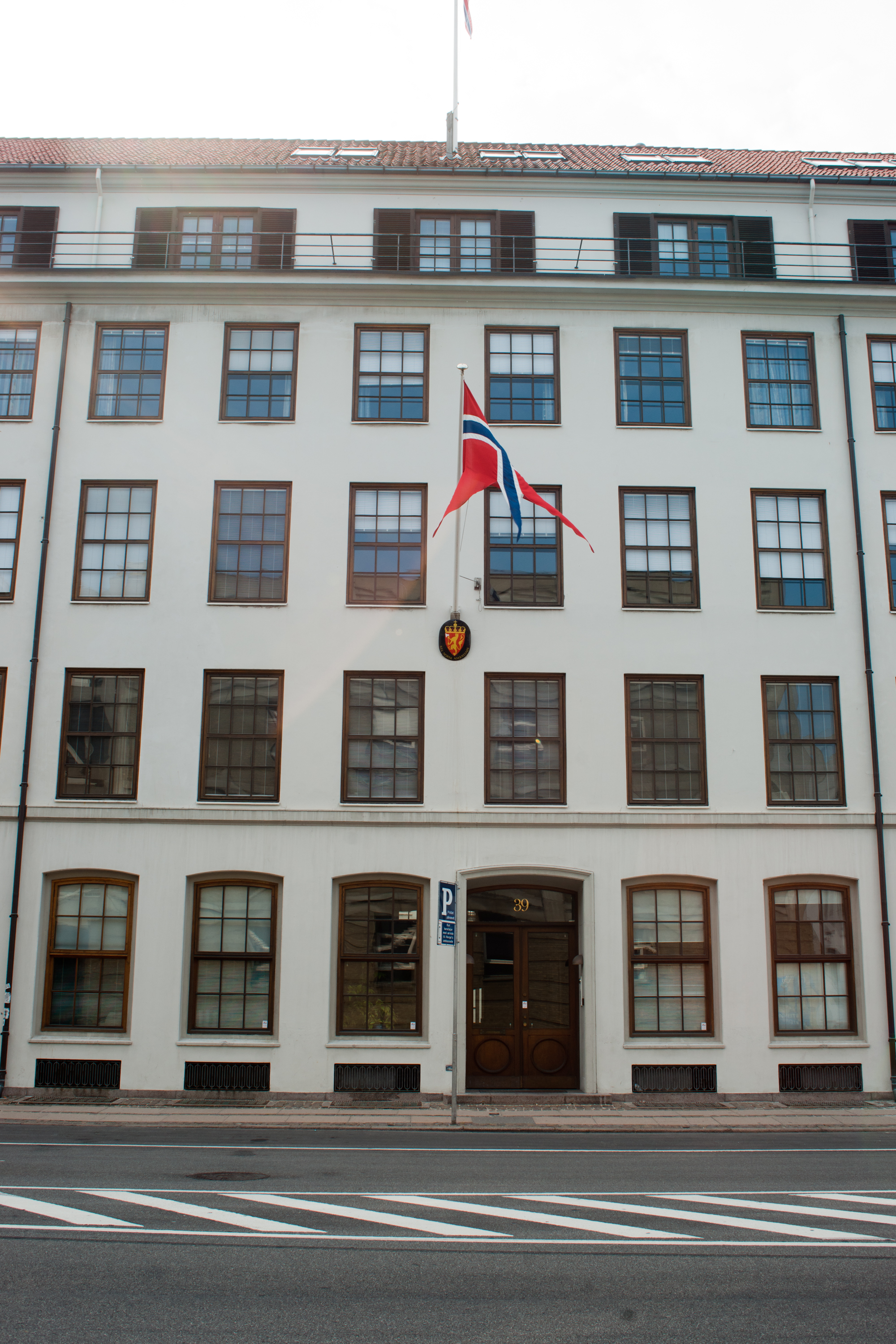
Embassy of Norway in Copenhagen

Denmark–Norway is the historiographical name for a former political entity consisting of the kingdoms of Denmark and Norway, including the originally Norwegian dependencies of Iceland, Greenland and the Faroe Islands. Following the strife surrounding the break-up of its predecessor, the Kalmar Union, the two kingdoms entered into another personal union in 1524 which lasted until 1814. The corresponding adjective and demonym is Dano-Norwegian.

The term Kingdom of Denmark is sometimes used to include both countries in the period 1536–1660, since the political and economic power emanated from Copenhagen, Denmark. The term covers the "royal part" of the Oldenburgs as it was in 1460, excluding the "ducal part" of Schleswig and Holstein. The administration used two official languages, Danish and German, and for several centuries both a Danish and German Chancery existed.

== Separation ==
Denmark and Norway parted when the union was dissolved in 1814. Iceland, which legally became a Danish colony in 1814, became an independent country in 1918 in a personal union, which would end in 1944.

Denmark is one of the original signatories of the Svalbard Treaty from 1920, which recognizes the sovereignty of Norway over the archipelago of Svalbard in the Arctic Ocean, and grants signatories equal rights to engage in commercial activities and scientific research on the archipelago. In the early 1930s Norway occupied portions of the Danish territory of Greenland. In 1933, the Permanent Court of International Justice ruled against Norwegian claims, and the occupation ended.

== World War II ==
Both Denmark and Norway were invaded by Germany in 1940, and the mainland territories of both countries were afterwards under German occupation with relatively light military casualties. Out of a population of 2100, over 770 Norwegian Jews were deported and killed during the occupation. In contrast, the rapid Danish capitulation resulted in the uniquely-lenient occupation of Denmark, until the summer of 1943, which also resulted and in postponing the deportation of Danish Jews until nearly all of them were warned and on their way to refuge in neutral Sweden. In the end, 477 Danish Jews were deported, and 70 of them lost their lives, out of a pre-war total of Jews and half-Jews at a little over 8,000.

== Modern relations ==
Denmark and Norway are important trading partners. In 2019, the two countries were each other's fifth largest sources of imports, whereas Norway was the third largest export destination for Denmark, and Denmark was the sixth largest export destination for Norway.

The Baltic Pipe, connecting Norway with Denmark and Poland, was completed in October 2022, to ensure natural gas supplies from Norway to Denmark and Poland.

== See also ==
- Foreign relations of Denmark
- Foreign relations of Norway
- Danish humanitarian aid to Norway during World War II
- Danish and Norwegian alphabet
- Differences between Norwegian Bokmål and Standard Danish
- Royal Dano-Norwegian Navy
- Treaty of Copenhagen (1660)
- Danish colonization of the Americas
- Danish Norwegians
