= Angrboða =

Norse mythical character

Angrboða (Old Norse: [ˈɑŋɡz̠ˌboðɑ]; also Angrboda) is a jötunn in Norse mythology. She is the mate of Loki and the mother of monsters. She is only mentioned once in the Poetic Edda (Völuspá hin skamma) as the mother of Fenrir by Loki. The Prose Edda (Gylfaginning) describes her as "a giantess in Jötunheimar" and as the mother of three monsters: the wolf Fenrir, the Midgard serpent Jörmungandr, and the ruler of the dead Hel.

== Name ==
The Old Norse name Angrboða has been translated as 'the one who brings grief', 'she-who-offers-sorrow', or 'harm-bidder'. The first element, meaning 'trouble, affliction', also 'grief, contrition', was borrowed into English as anger. The second element derives from Proto-Germanic *beudan ('to offer').

According to some scholars, the name Angrboða is probably a late invention dating from no earlier than the 12th century, although the tradition of the three monsters born of Loki and a jötunn may be of greater age.

== Attestations ==
=== Angrboða ===
In Völuspá hin skamma (Short Völuspá; a poem of Hyndluljóð), Angrboða is mentioned as the mate of Loki and mother of the wolf (Fenrir).

Loki sired the wolf on Angrboda,
and got Sleipnir on Svadilfari;
the witch alone seemed most evil
the one that came from the brother of Byleipt.

— Völuspá hin skamma, 40, trans. J. Lindow, 2002.

Gylfaginning (Beguiling of Gylfi) mentions the three monstrous children of Angrboða: the wolf Fenrir, the Midgard serpent Jörmungand, and the ruler of the dead Hel.

There was a giantess called Angrboda in Giantland [Jötunheimr]. With her Loki had three children. One was Fenrir, the second Iormungand [the Midgard serpent], the third is Hel. And when the gods realized that these three siblings were being brought up in Giantland, and when the gods traced prophecies stating that from these siblings great mischief and disaster would arise for them, then they all felt evil was to be expected from them, to begin with because of their mother’s nature, but still worse because of their father's.

— Gylfaginning, 27–34, trans. A. Faulkes, 1987.

=== Giantess in Ironwood ===
Völuspá (Prophecy of the Völva) also mentions a jötunn living in Járnvid (Ironwood, the forest where female jötnar live), most likely identified with Angrboða.

To the east sat the old lady in Járnvid
And raised there the kinfolk of Fenrir.

— Völuspá, 40, trans. J. Lindow, 2002.

This stanza is paraphrased by Snorri Sturluson in Gylfaginning:

Then spoke Gangleri: ‘What is the origin of the wolves?’

High said: ‘A certain giantess lives east of Midgard in a forest called Ironwood. In that forest live trollwives called Iarnvidiur. The ancient giantess breeds as sons many giants and all in wolf shapes, and it is from them that these wolves are descended. And they say that from this clan will come a most mighty one called Moongarm. He will fill himself with the lifeblood of everyone that dies, and he will swallow heavenly bodies and spatter heaven and all the skies with blood. As a result the sun will lose its shine and winds will then be violent and will rage to and fro. Thus it says in Voluspa:

In the east lives the old one, in Ironwood, and breeds there Fenrir’s kind. Out of them all comes one in particular, sun’s snatcher in troll’s guise.
He gorges the life of doomed men, reddens gods' halls with red gore. Dark is sunshine for summers after, all weathers hostile. Know you yet, or what?’

— Gylfaginning, 12–14, trans. A. Faulkes, 1987.

In the stanza 42 of Völuspá, Eggþér is portrayed as the herder of the jötunn who lives in Járnviðr (Ironwood). Peter H. Salus and Paul B. Taylor argue that he may have been Angrboða's wolf-herder.
