= Háleygjatal =

Skaldic poem

Háleygjatal is a skaldic poem by Eyvindr Skáldaspillir written towards the end of the 10th century to establish the Hlaðir dynasty as the social equals of the Hárfagri dynasty

The poem is only partially preserved in disjoint parts quoted in Skáldskaparmál, Heimskringla and two other manuscripts of kings' sagas. It appears to be a lesser imitation of Ynglingatal. Just like Ynglingatal it contains 27 generations (3 x 3 x 3), and some expressions appear to be borrowed from Ynglingatal. Moreover, it is composed in the same meter, kviðuháttr, and the theme seems to be to trace the lineage of the poet's patron to the gods.

An early part of the poem quoted in Ynglinga saga mentions Odin and Skaði as the ancestors of Sæmingr.

Þann skjaldblœtr skattfœri gat Ása niðr við járnviðju, þás þau mær í manheimum skatna vinr ok Skaði byggðu, sævar beins, ok sunu marga ǫndurdís við Óðni gat. — Russell Poole 2012	‘The shield-worshipped kinsman of the Æsir <gods> [= Óðinn] begat that tribute-bringer [JARL = Sæmingr] with the female from Járnviðr, when those renowned ones, the friend of warriors [= Óðinn] and Skaði [giantess], lived in the lands of the maiden of the bone of the sea [(lit. ‘maiden-lands of the bone of the sea’) ROCK > GIANTESS > = Jǫtunheimar ‘Giant-lands’], and the ski-goddess [= Skaði] bore many sons with Óðinn.’ — Russell Poole 2012
