= Nepr =

Norse deity

In Norse mythology, Nepr (anglicized as Nep) is the father of the goddess Nanna, according to Snorri Sturluson's Gylfaginning (32, 49) only.

Nepr is also listed in the þulur among the sons of Odin.

In the Poetic Edda poem Hyndluljóð, a figure by the name of Nanna is listed as the daughter of Nökkvi and as a relative of Óttar.

The meaning of his name is unclear.
