= Þrymheimr =

Mythological location

In Norse mythology, Þrymheimr is a home located in the giants' territory Jötunheimr. It was the residence of a jötunn, Þjazi, and was inherited by his daughter Skaði, later the wife of Njörðr.

== Abduction of Iðunn and aftermath ==
Þjazi, the jötunn who originally owned Þrymheimr, once abducted the goddess Iðunn from the Æsir and kept her captive there. Without Iðunn, whose apples kept them youthful, the Æsir began to age, and arranged a rescue. Þjazi was killed while attempting to recapture her.

After the Þjazi's death, his daughter — the giantess / goddess Skaði — inherited and inhabited Þrymheimr. During the course of Skaði's marriage to the god Njörðr, the two separated over Skaði's preference for her home in Þrymheimr.

== Misspellings vs. alternate forms ==
In Old Norse the name Þrymheimr is sometimes transliterated as Thrymheim in English; it means something like "crash-home", "Thunder Home", or "noisy-home". Manuscripts of the Prose Edda also contain the spellings Þrumheimr and Þruþheimr. (Þrúðheimr is the home of Thor according to the poem Grímnismál.)

Some of the spellings may be intentional: Rudolf Simek translates the variant Þruþheimr as "power house" and notes that the variant translation is a fitting name for a jötunn's home.
