= Sigi =

Deity

In the Völsung cycle, Sigi is the ancestor of the Völsung lineage. In the Völsunga saga, he is said to be one of the sons of Odin. He is also listed among Odin's sons in the Nafnaþulur. He has a son called Rerir, whose son was Völsung, sire of Signy and Sigmund, who, together with his sister begot Sinfjötli. Sigmund also fathered Sigurd, possibly with Hjordis.

He was outlawed for murdering a slave who had outdone him in hunting. With the help of Odin, Sigi fled from the land and led successful raids, so much so that he became king of Húnaland, a country name referring both to the territories of the Franks, also known as the Hugones or Hugas, and the territories of the Huns. In his old age, he was killed by his wife's brothers who seized his kingdom. His son Rerir avenged him.

Sigi (or Siggi) is also mentioned in the prologue of the Prose Edda, where he is said to have ruled over Frakland (land of the Franks): "Odin's third son is named Sigi, his son Rerir. These the forefathers ruled over what is now called Frankland; and thence is descended the house known as Völsungs."
