= Ítreksjóð =

Norse deity

In Norse mythology, Ítreksjóð (Old Norse) is a son of Odin and a god. Ítreksjóð is attested in one of the Nafnaþulur verses at the end of the Prose Edda book Skáldskaparmál, where he is numbered among the Æsir and listed as one of Odin's sons. Ítreksjóð is sometimes modernly anglicized as Itreksiod or Itreksjod.
