= Meili =

Norse deity

In Norse mythology, Meili (Old Norse: [ˈmɛile]) is a god, son of Odin and Jörð, and brother of the god Thor. Meili is attested in the Poetic Edda, compiled in the 13th century from earlier traditional sources, and the Prose Edda, written in the 13th century by Snorri Sturluson. In the nafnaþulur, a section at the end of the Prose Edda that may be later, he is named as a son of the god Odin. No additional information is provided about Meili in either source.

== Attestations ==
In the Poetic Edda poem Hárbarðsljóð, Thor declares that, even if he were an outlaw, he would reveal his name and his homeland, for he is the son of Odin, the brother of Meili, and the father of Magni.

Meili receives four mentions in the Prose Edda book Skáldskaparmál. In chapter 17, verses from the poem Haustlöng (attributed to the 10th-century skald Þjóðólfr of Hvinir) are provided, where Thor is referred to as "Meili's brother". The lines mentioning Meili are also quoted in chapter 23. In chapter 22, additional quotes from Haustlöng are provided where a kenning is employed for the god Hœnir that refers to Meili ('step-Meili'). In the nafnaþulur at the end of the Prose Edda, Meili is listed among names of the Æsir and as a son of Odin (between the god Baldr and the god Víðarr).

== Reception ==
The name Meili is of unknown etymology and meaning. Rudolf Simek suggested der Liebe, 'the dear one'.

Scholars have generally accepted that Meili, like Thor, is a son of Odin. Some 19th-century scholars proposed that he should also be understood as having the same mother as Thor, Jörð, a goddess and the personified Earth. Also during the 19th century, Viktor Rydberg theorized that Baldr and Meili are one and the same.
