= Prologue (Prose Edda) =

First section of the Prose Edda

The Prologue is the first section of four books of the Prose Edda, and consists of a euhemerized account of the origins of Norse mythology. According to the Prologue, the Norse gods originate from the Trojans described in Homer's poetry, and are King Priam's descendants. Priam's grandson Thor traveled throughout the world after leaving Thrace, fighting monsters and a dragon; he eventually came far north where he married a local named Sif. From them descended both the Norse gods as well as royal lines of various kingdoms.

Regarding the euhemerization in the Prologue, Anthony Faulkes wrote that "undoubtedly one of the motives for including the prologue, and maybe the chief reason for the use of the frame device itself, was to avoid the criticism that his stories were dangerous to [Christian] orthodoxy". Rather than pagan gods, the figures of Norse legend are refashioned as human figures, if noble and powerful ones.

== Contents ==
The Prologue begins with a brief summary of the Book of Genesis: that Adam and Eve were the first humans, that as evil increased God sent the Great Flood to cleanse this world, and that both evil and wisdom have increased since. There are then some poetic musings on the cyclical nature of nature, man, and animals.

The next section includes a genealogy that begins with Priam. Priam's daughter Tróán married king Múnón or Memnon or Menon. Their son was Trór, or Thor, who was fostered in Thrace. At the age of 12, Thor slew his foster father. He then traveled the lands accomplishing mighty deeds, defeating beasts, giants, and a mighty dragon. In the North, he married a beautiful, golden-haired prophetess named Sibil, identified with Sif. The line of descendants of Thor and Sif is given as follows:

Lóriði, Einridi, Vingethor, Vingener, Móda, Magi, Seskef, Bedvig, Athra, Ítermann, Heremód, Skjaldun, Bjáf, Ját, Gudólfr, Finn, Fríallaf

Finally, the son of Fríallaf was "Vóden, whom we call Odin", who came to Germany (Saxland) and established the royal lines there.

"Odin had second sight, and his wife also; and from their foreknowledge he found that his name should be exalted in the northern part of the world and glorified above the fame of all other kings. Therefore, he made ready to journey out of Tyrkland [...] They made no end to their journeying till they were come north into the land that is now called Saxland"

In Saxland, Odin's sons Vegdeg, Beldeg (Baldr) and Sigi founded the ruling houses of the Franks, from whom descended the Völsungs. Odin himself moved on to Joðland, which the section says was known as Reiðgo in earlier times, where he established his son Skjöldr, from whom derive the Skjöldungs, the kings of the Danes. After this, Odin went on to Sweden, where there was a king named Gylfi. Old Sweden, Sviþjoð, is otherwise attested by Snorre to stretch from the Black Sea to the Baltic Sea and modern Sweden, along the river Tanais, Dniepr. King Gylfi welcomed Odin and his train as "men of Asia, who were called Æsir". In Sweden, Odin founded a city called Sigtúna as a Trojan colony. Later, Odin's son Yngvi became king of Sweden, founding the Yngling dynasty. Finally, Odin went on to Norway, where he established his son Sæmingr as king.

The Prologue concludes in a linguistic remark, observing that the Æsir when they came to the north, spread out until their language was the native language over all these lands.

The section's genealogy is obviously informed by Anglo-Saxon tradition, as preserved by Æthelweard, the Anglo-Saxon Chronicle and the Anglian collection. His genealogical descent from Seskef to Odin directly parallels that from Sceaf to Woden in Anglo-Saxon tradition, and explicitly gives Odin's original name as Vóden, explaining that the original names of the Æsir were better preserved in England. The specific form that the names take as well as retained errors in the ancestry of Odin indicate a source closely related to Anglian collection manuscript T. The prologue's Sescef matches this manuscript's Se Scef - 'this Scef', and he appears to have had used a set of genealogical notes made from the Anglian collection manuscript and brought to Iceland, where they would serve as the basis for his expanded account in the Prologue as well as specific passages within Heimskringla. These notes omitted the descent from Adam given Scef in the Anglian collection, freeing the prologue author to derive his Sescef from Thor and hence Priam. The names interposed are all associated with Thor: Lóriði, Einridi, Vingethor and Vingener derive from alternative names for Thor, while Móda and Magi are his sons Móði and Magni. the prologue author emulated the Anglo-Saxon pedigrees that converging on Woden, making the Scandinavian pedigrees converge on Odin by turning their eponymous founders, Yngvi of the Ynglings and Skjöldr of the Skjöldungs, into Odin's sons. In so doing, he creates a duplicate of Skjaldun, intermediate between Seskef and Odin in the portion of the pedigree derived from the Anglo-Saxon source, and representing the same Scyld.

== See also ==
- Heimskringla
- Scefings
- Sons of Odin
