= Járnviðr =

Mythological forest

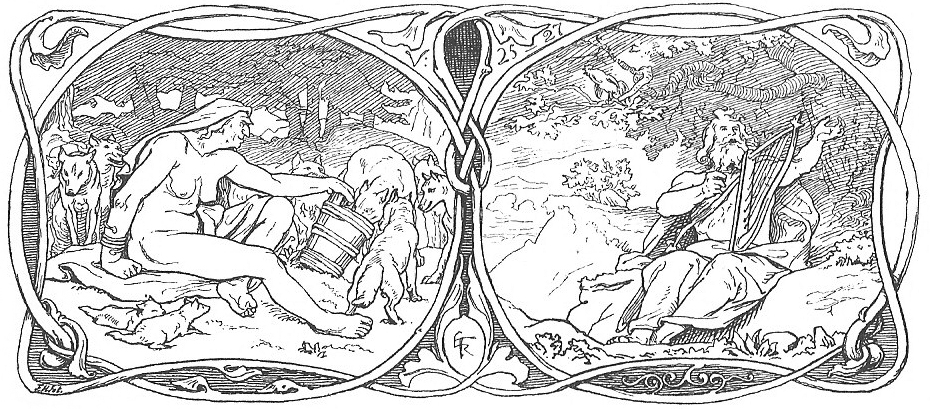

In Norse mythology, Járnviðr (Old Norse "Iron-wood") is a forest located east of Midgard, inhabited by troll women who bore jötnar and giant wolves. Járnviðr is attested in the Poetic Edda, compiled in the 13th century from earlier traditional sources, and the Prose Edda, written in the 13th century by Snorri Sturluson.

== Poetic Edda ==
Járnviðr is mentioned in Völuspá (40):

In the east sat an old woman in Iron-wood
and nurtured there offspring of Fenrir
a certain one of them in monstrous form
will be the snatcher of the moon

—Völuspá

The one that will be "the snatcher of the moon" is Mánagarmr (or Hati), and the "old woman" may refer to Fenrir's mother Angrboða.

== Prose Edda ==
Snorri Sturluson quotes this stanza and expands it in his Gylfaginning (12):

A witch dwells to the east of Midgard, in the forest called Ironwood: in that wood dwell the troll-women, who are known as Ironwood-Women [járnviðjur]. The old witch bears many giants for sons, and all in the shape of wolves; and from this source are these wolves sprung. The saying runs thus: from this race shall come one that shall be mightiest of all, he that is named Moon-Hound [Mánagarmr]; he shall be filled with the flesh of all those men that die, and he shall swallow the moon

—Gylfaginning

The form "Járnviðjur" ("Ironwoodite") is nowhere else to be found, but in singular, Járnviðja is listed in the þulur as a troll-wife, and in 10th century skald Eyvindr Skáldaspillir's Háleygjatal (2), referring to the goddess Skaði.
