= Dano-Norwegian (disambiguation) =

The adjective and derived noun Dano-Norwegian means "Danish and Norwegian". It can have two related meanings:

- the former (1536–1814) union between Denmark and Norway or its people; or by extension to anything relating to both of its two titular composite countries, Denmark and Norway;
- the Dano-Norwegian language, formerly a Norwegian variant of the Danish language and predecessor of the Bokmål written standard of the modern Norwegian language (cf. Gøtudanskt).
