= Carolyne Larrington =

British medieval scholar

Carolyne Larrington (born 1959) is an emeritus research fellow in English Literature of St John's College at the University of Oxford.

== Education and career ==
Larrington earned her bachelor's degree in medieval English language and literature from St Catherine's College, Oxford, followed in 1989 by an Oxford Doctor of Philosophy degree in Old English and Old Norse with a thesis on gnomic poetry, which was published in 1993 as A Store of Common Sense: Gnomic Themes and Style in Old Icelandic and Old English Wisdom Poetry.

After positions as a junior research fellow at Christ Church and teaching in Japan and at New College, in 1989 she was appointed for five years as a supernumerary fellow at St John's College, the college's first female fellow. She subsequently taught medieval literature at other Oxford colleges, at De Montfort University and at Birkbeck University. In 1999 she returned to St John's, where she was made an official fellow in 2014. In 2016 she became Professor of Medieval European Literature at Oxford. In 2023 she retired and became an emeritus research fellow at St John's.

== Research and publications ==
Larrington's research has mostly concerned Norse mythology and medieval Arthurian literature. Her areas of focus have included portrayals of emotion in medieval literature. She translated the Poetic Edda for Oxford World's Classics in 1996 (revised in 2014) and in 2017 published a handbook of Norse mythology, Norse Myths: A Guide to the Gods and Heroes. In 2023 she published The Norse Myths That Shape the Way We Think, a work in a series on world mythologies. In Celtic mythology and Arthurian literature, she published The Land of the Green Man: A Journey Through the Supernatural Landscapes of the British Isles in 2015. She has also published two books on Game of Thrones: Winter Is Coming: The Medieval World of "Game of Thrones" and All Men Must Die: Power and Passion in Game of Thrones.

== Honours ==
In August 2018, she was awarded the Icelandic Order of the Falcon for services to Icelandic literature.

== Selected books ==
- A Store of Common Sense: Gnomic Themes and Style in Old Icelandic and Old English Wisdom Poetry (1993) Clarendon Press ISBN 978-0198119821
- The Poetic Edda (1996; rev. ed. 2014) Oxford World's Classics ISBN 978-0198834571
- The Land of the Green Man: A Journey Through the Supernatural Landscapes of the British Isles (2015) I.B. Tauris ISBN 978-1780769912
- Winter Is Coming: The Medieval World of "Game of Thrones" (2016) I.B. Tauris ISBN 978-1784532567
- Norse Myths: A Guide to the Gods and Heroes (2017) Thames & Hudson ISBN 978-0500251966
- All Men Must Die: Power and Passion in Game of Thrones (2021) Bloomsbury ISBN 9781350141926
- The Norse Myths That Shape the Way We Think (2023) Thames & Hudson ISBN 978-0500252345
