= Peter H. Salus =

American linguist, and computer historian and advocate (1938–2026)

- Salus with a Tux pin, at IT-Højskolen in Copenhagen, Denmark, 2002
- Born: May 13, 1938; Vienna, Austria
- Died: May 15, 2026 (aged 88); Toronto, Canada

Peter Henry Salus (May 13, 1938 – May 15, 2026) was an American linguist, computer scientist, historian of technology, author in many fields, and an editor of books and journals. He conducted research in germanistics, language acquisition, and computer languages.

== Education and career ==
Salus completed a 1963 PhD in linguistics from New York University. His dissertation was The Compound Noun in Indo-European: A Survey.

After serving as professor and dean at University of North Florida, University of Toronto, University of Massachusetts where in 1967 he was involved in the founding of the Department of Linguistics, and Queens College, City University of New York..

He served as executive director of both the USENIX Association and the Sun User Group, and Vice President of the Free Software Foundation. He was one of the organizers of the 1996 conference on Freely Redistributable Software in Cambridge. In addition, he worked for several high tech startups. From 1987 to 1996, he was Managing Editor of the technical journal Computing Systems (MIT Press and the USENIX Association).

== Contributions ==
In 1966, Salus worked with W. H. Auden on a translation of the Poetic Edda. During his work he discovered that the "Airman's Alphabet" in Auden's work was derived from the Eddic poems or more likely the translation by Bruce Dickins. In December 1965 Salus attended a meeting of the Tolkien Society in New York. Auden and Salus' comments and intentions to write a book on J. R. R. Tolkien were reported by The New Yorker and The Daily Telegraph. However, Tolkien disapproved of a book on himself and was critical of Auden's reported remarks on his house and Salus' observations on the shape of Middle-earth.

Salus was best known for his books on the history of computing, particularly A Quarter Century of UNIX and Casting The Net (a history of the Internet up to 1995).

Peter Salus at the 1,000,000,000-second UNIX time event, in Copenhagen on 9 September 2001

== Death ==
Salus died on May 15, 2026, at the age of 88.

== Partial bibliography ==
- Völuspá : The Song of the Sybil (translated by Paul B. Taylor and W. H. Auden, Icelandic text edited by Peter H. Salus and Paul B. Taylor, 1968)
- On Language: Plato to von Humboldt (Holt, Reinholt, and Winston, Inc., 1969)
- Linguistics (Bobbs-Merrill, 1969)
- Pāṇini to Postal: A Bibliography in the History of Linguistics (Linguistic Research, 1971)
- For W. H. Auden, 21 February 1972 (ed. Peter H. Salus and Paul B. Taylor, 1972)
- Language and the Language Arts (with James Flood, Prentice-Hall, 1984)
- A Quarter Century of UNIX (Addison Wesley, 1 June 1994; ISBN 0-201-54777-5)
- Casting the Net (Addison-Wesley, March 1995; ISBN 0-201-87674-4)
- Handbook of Programming Languages (ed.; Indianapolis, IN: Macmillan Technical Pub., 1998, LCCN 97-81204; four volumes: ISBN 1-57870-008-6, ISBN 1-57870-009-4, ISBN 1-57870-010-8, ISBN 1-57870-011-6)
- Big Book of IPv6 Addressing RFCs (Morgan Kaufmann, 2000; ISBN 0-12-616770-2)
- The Complete April Fools' Day RFCs (Peer-to-Peer Communications LLC, 2007; ISBN 978-1-57398-042-5)
- The Daemon, the Gnu & the Penguin (Reed Media Services, Sept. 2008; ISBN 978-0-9790342-3-7) – previously serialised on the Groklaw website
- The ARPANET Sourcebook: The Unpublished Foundations of the Internet (Peer-to-Peer Communications LLC, 2008; ISBN 978-1-57398-000-5)
