= Eyvindr skáldaspillir =

10th-century Norwegian poet

Eyvindr Finnsson skáldaspillir
- Born: c. 915
- Died: c. 990
- Occupation: Skald
- Writing career
- Language: Old Norse
- Years active: 10th century
- Period: Viking Age
- Notable works: Hákonarmál, Háleygjatal
- Literary movement: Skaldic poetry

Eyvindr Finnsson (c. 915–990), known by the epithet skáldaspillir ("the Plagiarist"), was a 10th-century Norwegian skald. He was the court poet of king Hákon the Good and earl Hákon of Hlaðir. His son Hárekr later became a prominent chieftain in Norway.

His preserved longer works are:

- Hákonarmál - Composed in memory of king Hákon and tells of his reception in Valhalla. The poem is similar to the earlier Eiríksmál.
- Háleygjatal - Recounts the ancestors of earl Hákon back up to Odin and tells of their deaths. The poem is similar to the earlier Ynglingatal.
- Some 14 stand-alone stanzas (lausarvísur) on historical events.

Among Evyindr's most celebrated lausarvísur is the following, attested in Haralds saga Gráfeldar, supposedly composed during the 960s or 970s:

Snýr á Svǫlnis vôru
— svá hǫfum inn sem Finnar
birkihind of bundit
brums — at miðju sumri.

It is snowing on the spouse of Svǫlnir [i.e. the spouse of Óðinn, Jǫrð (the Old Norse equivalent of English ‘earth’)]
in the middle of summer;
we have tied up the bark-stripping hind of the bud [i.e. goat]
inside just like the Saami.

Eyvindr drew heavily on earlier poetry in his works. The cognomen skáldaspillir means literally "spoiler of poets" and is sometimes translated as "plagiarist", though it might also mean that he was better than any other poet.

He is mentioned in the second verse of the Norwegian national anthem.

== Editions and translations ==
- Evindr skáldaspillir Finsson, in Diana Whaley (ed.), Poetry from the Kings’ Sagas 1: From Mythical Times to c. 1035, Skaldic Poetry of the Scandinavian Middle Ages, 1 (Turnhout: Brepols, 2012), https://www.skaldic.org/skaldic/m.php?p=skald&i=57
