= Asgard =

Home of the gods in Nordic mythology

Asgard (Old Norse: Ásgarðr; "Enclosure of the Æsir") is a location associated with the gods in Nordic mythology. It appears in several Old Norse sagas and mythological texts, including the Eddas. It has also been suggested to be referred to indirectly in some of these sources. It is described as the fortified home of the Æsir gods and is often associated with gold imagery and contains other locations known in Nordic mythology such as Valhöll, Iðavöllr and Hlidskjálf. It is the equivalent of Mount Olympus of Greek Mythology.

In some euhemeristic accounts, Asgard is portrayed as being a city in Asia or Troy. In other accounts that likely more accurately reflect its conception in Old Norse religion, it is depicted as not conforming to a naturalistic geographical position. In these latter accounts, it is found in a range of locations such as over the rainbow bridge Bifröst, in the middle of the world and over the sea.

== Etymology ==
The compound word Ásgarðr combines Old Norse áss ("god") and garðr ("enclosure"). Possible anglicisations include: Ásgarthr, Ásgard, Ásegard, Ásgardr, Asgardr, Ásgarth, Asgarth, Esageard, and Ásgardhr.

== Attestations ==
=== The Poetic Edda ===
Asgard is named twice in Eddic poetry. The first case is in Hymiskviða, when Thor and Týr journey from Asgard to Hymir's hall to obtain a cauldron large enough to brew beer for a feast for Ægir and the gods. The second instance is in Þrymskviða when Loki is attempting to convince Thor to dress up as Freyja in order to get back Mjölnir by claiming that without his hammer to protect them, jötnar would soon be living in Asgard.

Grímnismál contains among its cosmological descriptions, a number of abodes of the gods, such as Álfheim, Nóatún and Valhalla, which some scholars have identified as being in Asgard. Asgard is not mentioned at any point in the poem. Völuspá references Iðavöllr, one of the most common meeting places of Æsir gods, which in Gylfaginning, Snorri locates in the centre of Asgard.

In Crawford's translation of the Poetic Edda, Asgard is mentioned more frequently. One instance, in Harbarthsljoth, Graybeard gives Thor directions to Midgard and that Earth will show him the road to Asgard.

=== The Prose Edda ===
==== Prologue ====
The Prose Edda's euhemeristic prologue portrays the Æsir gods as people who travelled from the East to northern territories. According to Snorri, Asgard represented the town of Troy before Greek warriors overtook it. After the defeat, Trojans moved to northern Europe, where they became a dominant group due to their "advanced technologies and culture". Eventually, other tribes began to perceive the Trojans and their leader Trór (Thor in Old Norse) as gods.

==== Gylfaginning ====
In Gylfaginning, Snorri Sturluson describes how during the creation of the world, the gods made the earth and surrounded it with the sea. They made the sky from the skull of Ymir and settled the jötnar on the shores of the earth. They set down the brows of Ymir, forming Midgard, and in the centre of the world they built Asgard, which he identifies as Troy:

Old Norse text

Þar næst gerðu þeir sér borg í miðjum heimi, er kölluð er Ásgarðr. Þat köllum vér Trója. Þar byggðu goðin ok ættir þeira, ok gerðust þaðan af mörg tíðendi ok greinir bæði á jörðu ok í lofti. Þar er einn staðr, er Hliðskjálf heitir, ok þá er Óðinn settist þar í hásæti, þá sá hann of alla heima ok hvers manns athæfi ok vissi alla hluti, þá er hann sá.

Brodeur translation

Next they made for themselves in the middle of the world a city which is called Ásgard; men call it Troy. There dwelt the gods and their kindred; and many tidings and tales of it have come to pass both on earth and aloft. There is one abode called Hlidskjálf, and when Allfather sat in the high-seat there, he looked out over the whole world and saw every man's acts, and knew all things which he saw.

After Asgard is made, the gods then built a hof named Glaðsheimr at Iðavöllr, in the centre of the burg, or walled city, with a high seat for Odin and twelve seats for other gods. It is described as like gold both on the inside and the outside, and as the best of all buildings in the world. They also built Vingólf for the female gods, which is described as both a hall and a hörgr, and a forge with which they crafted objects from gold. After Ragnarök, some gods such as Váli and Baldr will meet at Iðavöllr where Asgard once stood and discuss matters together. There they will also find in the grass the golden chess pieces that the Æsir had once owned.

Later, the section describes how an unnamed jötunn came to the gods with his stallion, Svaðilfari and offered help in building a burg for the gods in three winters, asking in return for the sun, moon, and marriage with Freyja. Despite Freyja's opposition, together the gods agree to fulfill his request if he completes his work in just one winter. As time goes on, the gods grow desperate as it becomes apparent that the jötunn will construct the burg on time. To their surprise, his stallion contributes much of the progress, swiftly moving boulders and rocks. To deal with the problem, Loki comes up with a plan whereupon he changes his appearance to that of a mare, and distracts Svaðilfari to slow down construction. Without the help of his stallion, the builder realises he cannot complete his task in time and goes into a rage, revealing his identity as a jötunn. Thor then kills the builder with Mjöllnir, before any harm to the gods is done. The chapter does not explicitly name Asgard as the fortress but they are commonly identified by scholars.

In Gylfaginning, the central cosmic tree Yggdrasil is described as having three roots that hold it up; one of these goes to the Æsir, which has been interpreted as meaning Asgard. In Grímnismál, this root instead reaches over the realm of men. The bridge Bifröst is told to span from the heavens to the earth and over it the Æsir cross each day to hold council beneath Yggdrasil at the Urðarbrunnr. Based on this, Bifröst is commonly interpreted as the bridge to Asgard.

==== Skáldskaparmál ====
Asgard is mentioned briefly throughout Skáldskaparmál as the name for the home of the Æsir, as in Gylfaginning. In this section, a number of locations are described as lying within Asgard including Valhalla, and in front of its doors, the golden grove Glasir. It also records a name for Thor as 'Defender of Ásgard' (Old Norse: verjandi Ásgarðs).

=== Ynglinga Saga ===
In the Ynglinga saga, found in Heimskringla, Snorri describes Asgard as a city in Asia, based on a perceived, but erroneous, connection between the words for Asia and Æsir. In the opening stanzas of the Saga of the Ynglings, Asgard is the capital of Asaland, a section of Asia east of the river Tana-kvísl or Vana-Kvísl (kvísl is "arm"), which Snorri explains is the river Tanais (now Don), flowing into the Black Sea. Odin then leaves to settle in the northern part of the world and leaves his brothers Vili and Vé to rule over the city. When the euhemerised Odin dies, the account states that the Swedes believed he had returned to Asgard and would live there forever.

== Interpretation and discussion ==
Cosmology in Old Norse religion is presented in a vague and often contradictory manner when viewed from a naturalistic standpoint. Snorri places Asgard in the centre of the world, surrounded by Midgard and then the lands inhabited by jötnar, all of which are finally encircled by the sea. He also locates the homes of the gods in the heavens. This had led to the proposition of a system of concentric circles, centred on Asgard or Yggdrasil, and sometimes with a vertical axis, leading upwards towards the heavens.

There is debate between scholars over whether the gods were conceived of as living in the heavens, with some aligning their views with Snorri, and others proposing that he at times presents the system in a Christian framework and that this organisation is not seen in either Eddic or skaldic poetry. The concept of attempting to create a spatial cosmological model has itself been criticised by scholars who argue that the oral traditions did not form a naturalistic, structured system that aimed to be internally geographically consistent.

An alternative proposal is that the world should be conceived of as a number of realms connected by passages that cannot be typically traversed. This would explain how Asgard can be located both to the east and west of the realm of men, over the sea and over Bifröst.

It has been noted that the tendency to link Asgard to Troy is part of a wider European cultural practice of claiming Trojan origins for one's culture, first seen in the Aeneid and also featuring in Geoffrey of Monmouth's Historia regum Britanniae for the founding of Britain.

== Depictions in popular culture ==
=== In film ===
Asgard is depicted in the 1989 comedy film Erik the Viking as a frozen wasteland dominated by the Halls of Valhalla on a high plateau. In the film the Æsir are depicted as spoilt children

=== In comics ===
Thor first appeared in the Marvel Universe within comic series Journey into Mystery in the issues #83 during August 1962. Following this release, he becomes one of the central figures in the comics along with Loki and Odin. In the Marvel Cinematic Universe, Thor and Loki make their first appearance together in the 2011 film Thor. After that, Thor becomes a regular character in the Marvel Cinematic Universe and reappears in several films, including the Avengers series. Asgard becomes the central element of the film Thor: Ragnarok, where it is destroyed following the Old Norse mythos. These and other Norse mythology elements also appear in video games, TV series, and books based in and on the Marvel Universe, although these depictions do not closely follow historical sources.

=== In video games ===
Asgard is a city in the 2003 Japanese role-playing videogame Tales of Symphonia, and is dubbed "The City of Ruins" for its presence of fictional ancient ruins.

Asgard is an explorable realm in the video game God of War: Ragnarök, a sequel to 2018's Norse-themed God of War.

In the Assassin's Creed Valhalla video game, Asgard is featured as part of a "vision quest".

== See also ==
- Mount Olympus – home of the Olympian gods

== Bibliography ==
=== Primary ===
- Bellows, Henry Adams, ed. (1923). "Lays of the Gods: Voluspo". The Poetic Edda. Scandinavian classics, vols. 21, 22. Translated by Bellows, Henry Adams. New York: American-Scandinavian Foundation. p. 3.
- Crawford, Jackson (2015). The Poetic Edda : stories of the Norse Gods and heroes. Chicago: Hackett Publishing Company, Inc. pp. 12–14, 47–58, 68, 95. ISBN 978-1-62466-356-7. OCLC 905921490.
- Laing, Samuel (1961). Heimskringla. Part two, Sagas of the Norse Kings. London: Dent. ISBN 0460008471.
- Orchard, Andy (2011). The Elder Edda : a book of Viking lore. London: Penguin Books. ISBN 9780141393728.
- Sturluson, Snorri; Byock, Jesse L. (2005). The prose Edda: Norse mythology. London: Penguin Classics. pp. 30–48, 55–78, 80–83, 93–94, 97. ISBN 0-14-044755-5. OCLC 59352542.
- Sturluson, Snorri (2018). The Prose Edda. Translated by Brodeur, Arthur Gilchrist. Franklin Classics Trade Press. ISBN 9780344335013.
- "Gylfaginning (Old Norse)". heimskringla.no.
- "Skaldskáparmál (Old Norse)". heimskringla.no.

=== Secondary ===
- Boult, Katherine (1948). Asgard and the Norse Heroes. Ann Arbor: University of Michigan Library. pp. 21, 56–59, 72, 82–90, 121–123. ISBN 978-1176204492.
- Fontenrose, Joseph (1983). "The Building of the City Walls: Troy and Asgard". The Journal of American Folklore. 96 (379): 53–63. doi:10.2307/539834. ISSN 0021-8715. JSTOR 539834.
- Heide, Eldar (2014). "Contradictory cosmology in Old Norse myth and religion – but still a system?". Maal og Minne (in Norwegian). 106 (1). ISSN 1890-5455.
- Lindow, John (2002). Norse mythology : a guide to the Gods, heroes, rituals, and beliefs. Oxford: Oxford University Press. pp. 13, 37, 54–56. ISBN 9786610532490. OCLC 1136323846.
- Mattioli, Vittorio (2018). "Grímnismál : a critical edition". University of St Andrews. S2CID 165843311.
- Simek, Rudolf (2008). A Dictionary of Northern Mythology. Translated by Hall, Angela. BOYE6. ISBN 9780859915137.
- "Asgard | Norse mythology". Encyclopedia Britannica.
- "You can visit Asgard and Jotunheim in Assassin's Creed Valhalla". PCGamesN. 15 October 2020.
- God Of War Ragnarök Developer Interview. IGN. 9 September 2021.
