= Vingólf =

Place in Norse mythology

In Norse mythology, Vingólf is one of the buildings of the gods. It is described as the hall or hörgr of the goddesses and also as a place where righteous men and those slain in battle go after death. It is mentioned in the Prose Edda, Gylfaginning 3 and in the enigmatic poem Hrafnagaldur Óðins.

== The Prose Edda ==
Vingólf is mentioned three times in the Gylfaginning section of Snorri Sturluson's Prose Edda.

Hitt er mest, er hann gerði manninn ok gaf honum önd þá er lifa skal ok aldri týnask, þótt líkaminn fúni at moldu eða brenni at ösku. Ok skulu allir menn lifa þeir er rétt eru siðaðir ok vera með honum sjálfum þar sem heitir Gimlé eða Vingólf, en vándir menn fara til Heljar ok þaðan [í Ni]flhel, þat er niðr í inn níunda heim. Eysteinn Björnsson's edition

His greatest achievement, however, is the making of man and giving him a soul which will live and never die, although his body may decay to dust or burn to ashes. All righteous men shall live and be with him where it is called Gimlé [lee-of-fire] or Vingólf [friendly door], but wicked men will go to Hel and thence to Niflhel [abode of darkness]: that is down in the ninth world. Young's translation

Í upphafi setti hann stjórnarmenn ok beiddi þá at dœma með sér ørlög manna ok ráða um skipun borgarinnar. Þat var þar sem heitir Iðavöllr í miðri borginni. Var þat hit fyrsta þeira verk at gera hof þat er sæti þeira standa í, tólf önnur en hásætit þat er Allföðr á. Þat hús er bezt gert á jörðu ok mest, allt er þat úta⟨n⟩ ok innan svá sem gull eitt. Í þeim stað kalla menn Glaðsheim. Annan sal gerðu þeir, þat var hörgr er gyðjurnar áttu, ok var hann allfagr. Þat hús kalla menn Vingólf. - Eysteinn Björnsson's edition

At first he appointed rulers who, along with him, were to control the destinies of men, and decide how the stronghold should be governed. That was in the place called Iðavöll [plain that renews itself or plain of activity] in the middle of the stronghold. Their first task was to build a temple in which there were seats for the twelve of them, apart from the high-seat of the All-father. That is the largest and best dwelling on earth; outside and in it is like pure gold; it is called Glaðsheim [Radiant Home]. They built another hall that was the sanctuary of the goddesses, and it was a very beautiful building; it is called Vingólf. - Young's translation

Óðinn heitir Allföðr, þvíat hann er faðir allra goða. Hann heitir ok Valföðr, þvíat hans óskasynir eru allir þeir er í val falla. Þ[eim ski]par hann Valhöll ok Vingólf, ok heita þeir þá Einherjar. Eysteinn Björnsson's edition

Odin is called Allfather because he is father of all the gods. He is also called Father of the Slain, because all those that fall in battle are the sons of his adoption; for them he appoints Valhall and Vingólf, and they are then called Champions. Brodeur's translation

The three mentions of Vingólf seem somewhat contradictory. In the first instance it appears as an alternative name for Gimlé, a paradise where righteous people go after death. In the second instance it is the hall or hörgr of the goddesses. In the third instance it is a residence for those slain in battle.

The name does not occur in Eddaic or skaldic poetry.

== Hrafnagaldur Óðins ==
The enigmatic Hrafnagaldur Óðins, a young mythological poem composed in the Eddic style, mentions Vingólf in one of its strophes.

Vingólf tóku Viðars þegnar, Fornjóts sefum fluttir báðir; iðar ganga, æsi kveðja Yggjar þegar við ölteiti. EB's edition	Arrived at Vingólf Viðar's thains, by Fornjót's sons both transported; they walk within, greet the Æsir forthwith at Yggur's merry ale-feast[.] EB's translation	Vingolf reached Vidur's ministers, both borne by Forniot's kin. They entered, and the Æsir forthwith saluted, at Ygg's convivial meeting. Thorpe's translation

The context is enigmatic but Vingólf seems to be a place where the Æsir have gathered for an ale feasts. The significance of this mention hinges on the interpretation of Hrafnagaldur Óðins as a whole.

== Vingólf's name ==
The name Vingólf is usually thought to be composed of vinr (friend) and gólf (floor, hall) and mean something like "pleasant hall". Alternatively the name could be read Víngólf and the meaning would be "wine hall".

Uppsalabók, one of the four main manuscripts of the Prose Edda, has the variant reading Vindglóð seemingly meaning "wind ember" but most variant readings which occur only in that manuscript are thought to be corrupted.
