= Valaskjálf =

Mythological location

In Norse mythology, Valaskjálf ("the Shelf of the Slain") is one of Odin's Halls, a great dwelling built and roofed with pure silver. In this room is a high seat, Hliðskjálf, where Odin can watch over the entire universe.

== See also ==
- Valhalla, another of Odin's halls, to where half of those who were killed in battle go.
