= Glaðsheimr =

Norse mythical location

In Norse mythology, Glaðsheimr (Old Norse "bright home") is a realm in Asgard where Odin's hall of Valhalla is located according to Grímnismál.

Snorri states in Gylfaginning that Glaðsheimr is a meeting hall containing thirteen high seats where the male Æsir hold council, located in Iðavöllr in Asgard, near the hall of Vingólf where the Ásynjur goddesses gathered.
