= Eiríksmál =

Skaldic poem

Eiríksmál is a skaldic poem composed c. 954 at the behest of the Norwegian queen Gunnhild in honour of her slain consort Erik Bloodaxe. Only the beginning of the poem is extant.

According to Roger of Wendover, Eric, a Viking ruler was betrayed and killed on Stainmore in 954 AD, while on the run and after being expelled from York. Eric had previously been King of Northumbria (c. 947–948 and 952–954) during his more successful days.

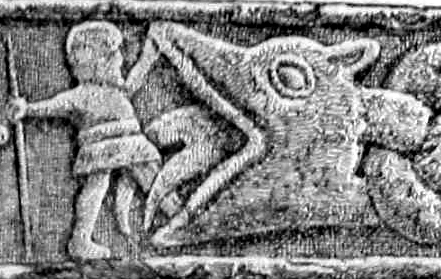
Fenrir - wolf and enemy of Odin, Gosforth Cross

== Structure ==
Although classified as a Skaldic poem since it deals with a historical figure, it is actually anonymous and in the simple fornyrðislag meter, rather than ornate dróttkvætt. It thus has much in common with the poems of the Poetic Edda. The later poem Hákonarmál appears to be modelled on Eiríksmál.

The poem is cast as a dialogue between Eric, the gods Odin and Bragi, and the legendary hero Sigmund.

== Translation from Old Norse ==
Based on Finnur Jónsson’s Norse edition, English translation by Wikipedia editors.

=== Verse 1, Odin ===
"Hvat's þat drauma? hugðumk fyr dag rísa
Valhöll at ryðja fyr vegnu fólki;
vakðak Einherja, baðk upp at rísa,
bekki at stráa, bjórker at leyðra,
valkyrjur vín bera, sem vísi kœmi."

Translation:

"What kind of dream is this? I thought myself rise before day-break
to prepare Valhalla for a slain troop.
I awoke the Einherjar, I bade them to rise up
to strew up benches, to rinse the beer-vats;
the Valkyries to carry wine, as if a prince were coming.

=== Verse 2, Odin ===
Erum ór heimi hölða vánir
göfugra nökkurra, svá's mér glatt hjarta."

Translation:

Out of the world are by me warriors expected,
some certain glorious ones; thus my heart is glad."

=== Verse 3, Bragi ===
"Hvat þrymr þar, sem þúsund bifisk
eða mengi til mikit?
Braka öll bekkþili, sem muni Baldr koma
eptir í Óðins sali."

Translation:

"What thunders there, as if a thousand were marching,
or a too great gathering of men?
The tables are all crashing, as if Balder were coming
back to Odin's halls." (Note: As described in several sources, Odin's son Balder was accidentally killed by his blind brother Höðr, who was tricked by Loki. The gods later failed in bringing him back from Hel, and so his return would have been cause for great celebration.)

=== Verse 4, Odin ===
"Heimsku mæla skalat hinn horski Bragi,
þvít þú vel hvat vitir.
Fyr Eireki glymr, es hér mun inn koma
jöfurr í Óðins sali."

Translation:

"The wise Bragi should not speak foolishly,
for you know well what is happening:
For Erik this noise is made, as he here will come in;
the prince into Odin's halls!"

=== Verse 5, Odin ===
"Sigmundr ok Sinfjötli, rísið snarliga
ok gangið í gögn grami,
inn þú bjóð, ef Eirekr sé,
hans es mér nú ván vituð."

Translation:

"Sigmund and Sinfjotli, rise quickly
and go to meet the ruler.
Invite him in, if Erik it is,
it is he I now expect."

=== Verse 6, Bragi, Odin ===
"Hví 's þér Eireks ván heldr an annarra?"
"Þvít mörgu landi hefr hann mæki roðit
ok blóðugt sverð borit."

Translation:

"Why do you expect Erik, rather than others?"
"For in many lands has he reddened the blade
and borne a bloody sword." (Note: Odin was eager and anxious for Erik to arrive in Valhalla because he needed his military skills to help defend Valhalla from the forces of chaos.)

=== Verse 7, Bragi, Odin ===
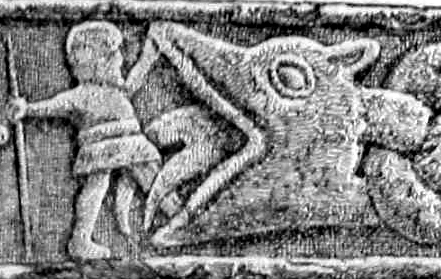
Depiction of the wolf Fenrir on the Gosforth Cross.

"Hví namt hann sigri þá, es þér þótti snjallr vesa?"
"Óvíst 's at vita, nær ulfr hinn hösvi
[greypr] á sjöt goða."

Translation:

"Why did you then deprive him of victory, when you thought him so brave?"
"For it is uncertain to know when the grey-coated wolf
attacks the seat of the gods."

=== Verse 8, Sigmund ===
"Heill þú nú Eirekr, vel skalt hér kominn
ok gakk í höll horskr.
Hins vilk þik fregna, hvat fylgir þér
jöfra frá eggþrimu."

Translation:

"Hail you now, Erik, you will here be greeted well
so enter the hall, wise one!
This I will ask you, who are those following you,
princes, from the edge-thunder?"

=== Verse 9, Erik ===
"Konungr 'ru fimm, kennik þér nafn allra,
ek em hinn sétti sjalfr."

Translation:

There are five kings, I shall teach you the names of them all;
I am myself the sixth.

== Sources ==
=== Online ===
- "Norse Mythology". norse-mythology.org.
- Finnur Jónsson's edition of Eiríksmál as part of Carmina Scaldica, Udvalg af norske og islandske skjaldekvad ved Finnur Jónsson, G.E.C. Gads Forlag - København 1929, online at heimskringla.no

=== Books ===
- Fulk, R. D. (2012). "Anonymous, Eiríksmál". In Whaley, Diana (ed.). Poetry from the Kings’ Sagas 1: From Mythical Times to c. 1035. Skaldic Poetry of the Scandinavian Middle Ages 1. Turnhout: Brepols. ISBN 978-2-503-51896-1.
- Page, R. I. (2002). Chronicles of the Vikings - Records, Memorials and Myths. British Museum Press. ISBN 0-7141-2800-7.
- Williams, Thomas (2017). Viking Britain - A History. William Collins Books. ISBN 978-0-00-817195-7.
