= Hákonarmál =

Old Norse skaldic poem – 'The Song of Hákon'

Hákonarmál (Old Norse: 'The Song of Hákon') is a skaldic poem which the skald Eyvindr skáldaspillir composed about the fall of the Norwegian king Hákon the Good at the battle of Fitjar and his reception in Valhalla. This poem emulates the approximately seven years older Eiríksmál and is intended to depict the Christian Hákon as a friend to the pagan gods. The poem is preserved in its entirety and is considered to be of great beauty.

== Contents ==
The poem consists of 21 ljóðaháttr stanzas. It begins with a description of the valkyries who come down to witness the battle and bring the slain to Valhalla (1). It then describes the bloody battle in ornate language (2–8), culminating with the fall of Hákon’s army (9). We then hear how Hákon is escorted to the green land of the gods (10–13) and welcomed by the gods Hermod and Bragi (14). Hákon expresses his fear of Odin's intentions, but Bragi reassures him that he is in good standing (15–16). Hákon then declares that he will keep his armour on, since a warrior must always be ready for war (17); he is then bid welcome by all Norse gods as thanks for his reverence for pagan shrines (18). The poem ends with three stanzas of praise (19–21):

Góðu dœgri / verðr sá gramr of borinn, es sér getr slíkan sefa. Hans aldar / mun æ vesa at góðu getit. Mun óbundinn / á ýta sjǫt Fenrisulfr fara, áðr jafngóðr / á auða trǫð konungmaðr komi. Deyr fé, / deyja frændr eyðisk land ok láð. Síz Hákon fór / með heiðin goð, mǫrg es þjóð of þéuð. – R. D. Fulk’s edition	On a good day / is born that great-souled lord who hath a heart like his; aye will his times / be told of on Earth, and men will speak of his might. Unfettered will fare / the Fenriswolf, and fall on the fields of men, ere that there cometh / a kingly lord as good, to stand in his stead. Cattle die / and kinsmen die, land and lieges are whelmed; since Hákon / to the heathen gods fared many a host is harried. – Hollander's translation	On a good day / will that king be born who gets such a heart. His lifetime / will forever be spoken of as good. Unfettered will / on the abode of men the Fenriswolf go, before an equally good / on the deserted pasture kingly man might come. Cattle die, / kinsmen die, land and realm are deserted. Since Hákon went / among the heathen gods many peoples are oppressed. – Literal translation

The last stanza is clearly related to a stanza from Hávamál. The traditional view is that Hákonarmál borrowed from that poem but it is also possible that the relation is reversed or that both poems drew on a third source.

== Related works ==
On his deathbed, Hákon the Good willed that his bodyguard, including Eyvindr, the author of Hákonarmál, should enlist into the service of the new king Harald Greycloak rather than carry on a doomed resistance. Eyvindr was not pleased with the new king and his missionary activities, as evidenced by the final stanza of Hákonarmál; he further composed several loose stanzas expressing his discontent with Harald, labelling him a tyrant (folkstríðir). These insulting poems led to Eyvindr’s falling out of the king’s favour, and he soon fled Harald’s court instead to serve his rival and eventual successor, the staunchly Norse pagan Hákon jarl, for whom he composed the genealogical poem Háleygjatal.
