= Bragi =

Skaldic god of poetry in Norse mythology

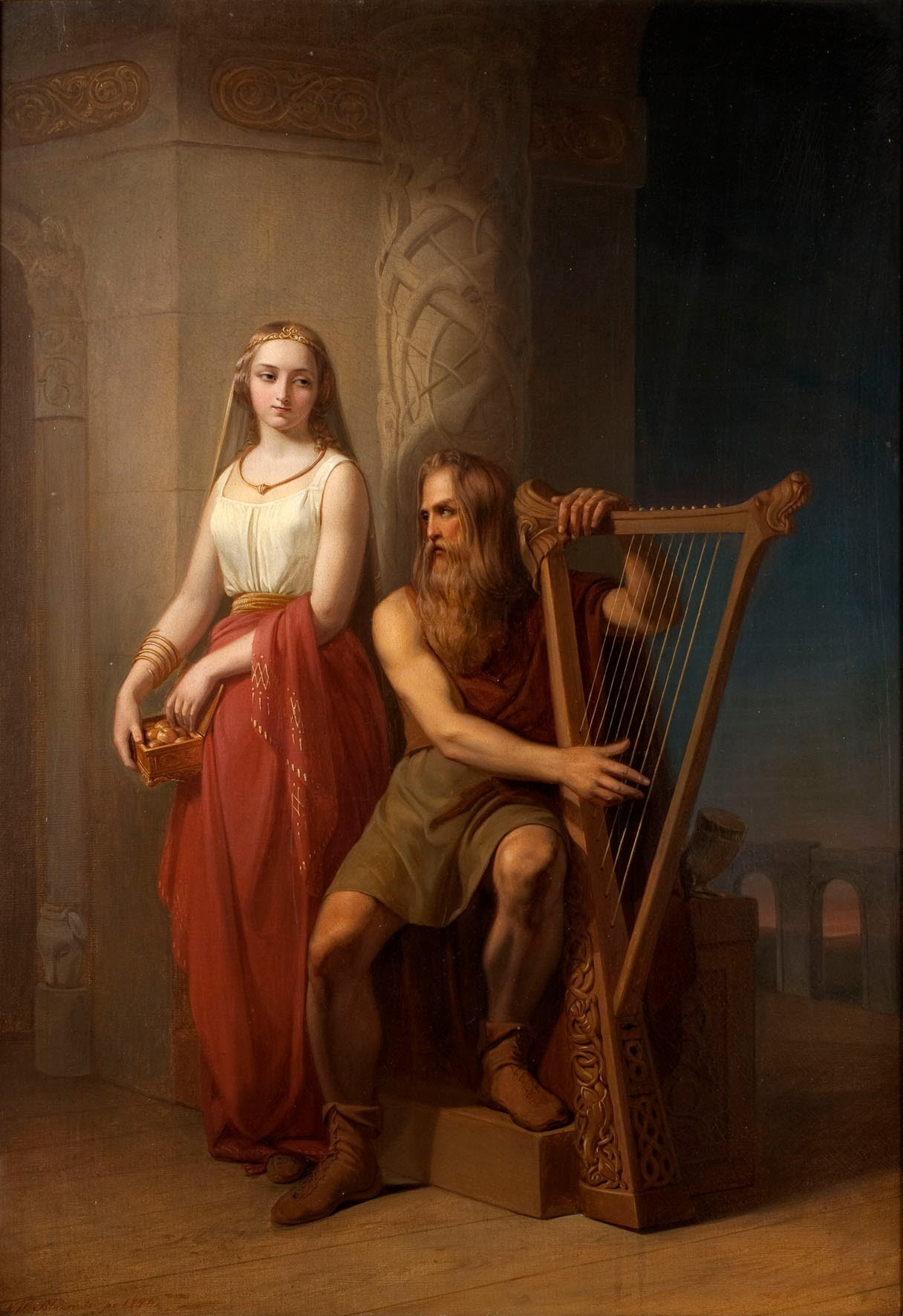
Bragi is shown with a harp and accompanied by his wife Iðunn in this 19th-century painting by Nils Blommér.

Bragi (Old Norse) is a figure in Norse mythology, and the god of poetry according to Snorri. The Prose Edda, Lokasenna and Grettis saga all portray him as the husband of the goddess Iðunn.

In skaldic poetry, Bragi appears as a resident of Valhalla who welcomes fallen kings. In Snorri's Prose Edda, Bragi is presented as a god of poetry, renowned for eloquence among the gods (Æsir). In the Poetic Edda, Bragi is only sparsely attested: he is named as "the most pre-eminent of poets" in Grímnismál; appears among the gods at Ægir's feast in Lokasenna, where he exchanges insults with Loki and is defended by his wife Iðunn; and is mentioned in connection with runes in Sigrdrífumál.

Modern scholarship generally understands Bragi as a figure that emerged through the posthumous mythologization of the 9th-century skald Bragi Boddason, traditionally reckoned as the first skald, rather than from an originally independent pre-Christian cult.

== Etymology ==
The origin of the theonym Bragi is obscure. It is generally connected with the Old Norse masculine noun bragr, which has two different meanings: 'poetry' (cf. Icelandic bragur 'poem, melody, verse') and 'the first, noblest' (cf. poetic Old Norse bragnar 'chiefs, men', bragningr 'king'). It remains uncertain which of these senses underlies the divine name. A further comparison with Old English brego ('lord, prince') has also been proposed, but this remains uncertain. The Old Norse compound braga-full, the ceremonial cup used for oath-taking, is generally derived from bragr in the sense 'the foremost, the noblest', rather than from its poetic meaning. Accordingly, it has been interpreted as meaning 'cup of the lord' or 'cup of Bragi'.

Snorri Sturluson derived bragr ('poetry') from the divine name; however, Rudolf Simek regards this association as secondary and suggests that it may have contributed to the later identification of Bragi as a god of poetry. The fact that Bragi is well attested as a personal name in Old Norse and Old Swedish sources has led Jan de Vries to suggest that the divine name itself may be secondary in origin.

At the same time, the noun bragr in the sense of 'poetry' has been etymologically derived from Proto-Indo-European *bʰróg̑ʰ-o, itself from the root *bʰreg̑ʰ- ('to formulate by religiously correct means'; cf. Old Irish bricht 'ritual utterance, spell', Old Indic bráhmaṇ- 'correct formulation, design'). From this perspective, de Vries allows that the divine name Bragi could perhaps reflect an older cultic concept associated with ritual song or incantation, in which case it would have to be distinguished from the personal name. Most scholars, however, argue that the god Bragi derives from the 9th-century skald Bragi Boddason, elevated after death to divine status, reflecting a process of gradual mythologization rather than the survival of an originally independent pre-Christian deity.

== Attestations ==
In Snorri Sturluson's Skáldskaparmál, Bragi is included as ''husband of Iðunn'' and ''first maker of poetry'' in a list of the gods. In Gylfaginning, he is also presented as the husband of Iðunn, and as a god renowned for wisdom and eloquence, with poetry said to be named after him. In Eddic poetry, however, Bragi is scarcely attested: only Grímnismál mentions him in a mythological context, but it may actually refer to the historical skald Bragi; in Lokasenna, he argues as one of the æsir with Loki, and here too Iðunn is said to be his wife; he is also mentioned in Sigrdrífumál in a somewhat unclear connection with runes. In skaldic poetry, Bragi appears only in Eiríksmál and Hákonarmál, and without clear divine status, where he functions as a figure welcoming deceased rulers to Valhalla. Finally, one mention in a stanza from Grettis saga portrays him as Iðunn's husband.

=== Poetic Edda ===
==== Grímnismál ====
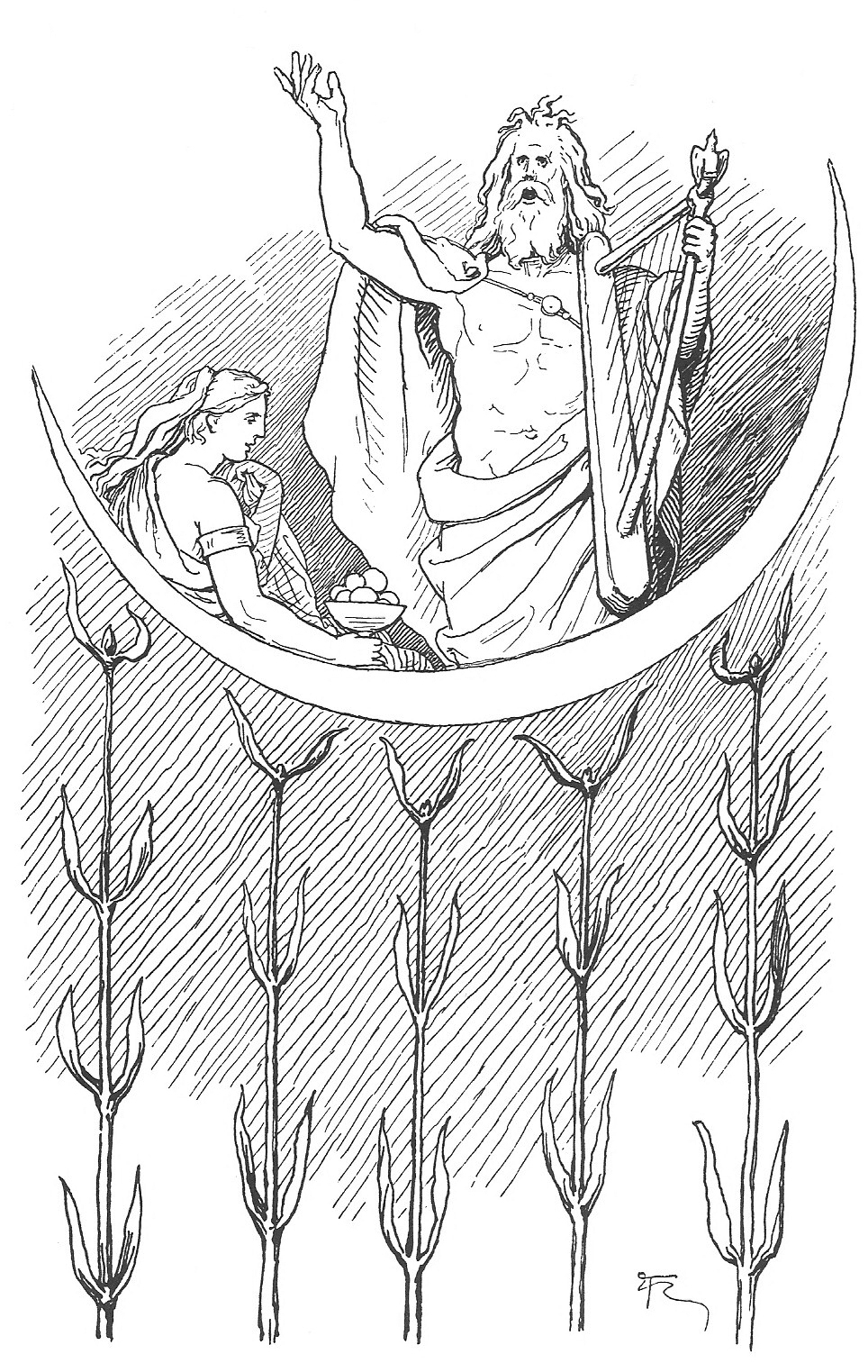
Bragi, holding a harp, sings before his wife Iðunn (1895) by Lorenz Frølich.

In Grímnismál, Bragi is named "the most pre-eminent of poets" within a list of superlatives that also includes Odin as the foremost of the Æsir and Sleipnir as the best of horses.

It is unclear if the passage refers to the god Bragi or to the historical skald Bragi Boddason.

Yggdrasill’s ash is the most pre-eminent of trees,

as is Skidbladnir of ships,

Odin of the Æsir, Sleipnir of horses,

Bilrost of bridges, Bragi of poets,

Habrok of hawks, and Garm of dog

— Poetic Edda, Grímnismál, 44., transl. by C. Larrington

==== Lokasenna ====
In Lokasenna, Bragi is among the first to exchange words with Loki after Loki gains entry to the Æsir by invoking his blood-brotherhood with Odin and is served a drink by Víðarr. It further emerges that Iðunn is his wife and that Bragi is said to have killed her brother. As the exchange escalates, Bragi is repeatedly taunted by Loki for his cowardliness and lack of martial prowess, and the confrontation is ultimately curtailed when Iðunn intervenes, urging him to restrain himself and to remember Loki's kinship with the gods.

Given Bragi's role in skaldic poetry as a figure who welcomes dead kings to Valhalla, it is noteworthy that he is the first of the feasting gods to address Loki upon his entry into Ægir's hall and is singled out for particular invective in Loki's opening speech to the assembled gods.

Bragi said:
‘A horse and a sword I’ll give you from my possessions,
and Bragi will recompense you with a ring too,
so you don’t repay the Æsir with hatred;
don’t make the gods exasperated with you!’

Loki said:
‘Both horses and arm-rings you’ll always
be short of, Bragi;
of the Æsir and the elves who are in here,
you’re the wariest of war
and shyest of shooting.’

Bragi said:
‘I know if I were outside, just as now I am inside
Ægir’s hall,
your head I’d be holding in my hand;
I’d see that as reward for your lies.’

Loki said:
‘You’re brave in your seat, but you won’t be doing that,
Bragi the bench-ornament!
You go and fight, if you are so furious,
the truly bold man doesn’t think twice!’

Idunn said:
‘I beg you, Bragi, that kin ties will hold
between the children and those who are adopted,
so you shouldn’t speak words of blame to Loki

in Ægir’s hall.’

— Poetic Edda, Lokasenna, 6–16, transl. by C. Larrington

==== Sigrdrífumál ====
A passage in Sigrdrífumál describes runes being carved on a wide range of objects: on the sun itself, on the ear of one of the sun-horses and the hoof of the other, on Sleipnir's teeth, on a bear's paw, an eagle's beak, a wolf's claw, and several other things, including Bragi's tongue. The runes are then shaved off, mixed with mead, and distributed so that the Æsir, elves, Vanir, and humans each receive a share. These are identified as speech runes, birth runes, ale runes, and magic runes. The precise meaning of this episode remains unclear.

‘“On a shield”, he said, “[the runes] should be cut,

the one which stands before the shining god,

on Arvak’s ear and Alsvinn’s hoof,

on that wheel which turns under [H]rungnir’s chariot,

on Sleipnir’s teeth and on the sledges’ strap-bands;

on the bear’s paw and on Bragi’s tongue,

on the wolf ’s claw, and the eagle’s beak,

on bloody wings and at the end of the bridge,

on hands which deliver and on the trail of a helpful man,

— Poetic Edda, Sigrdrífumál, 15–16., transl. by C. Larrington

=== Prose Edda ===
==== Gylfaginning ====
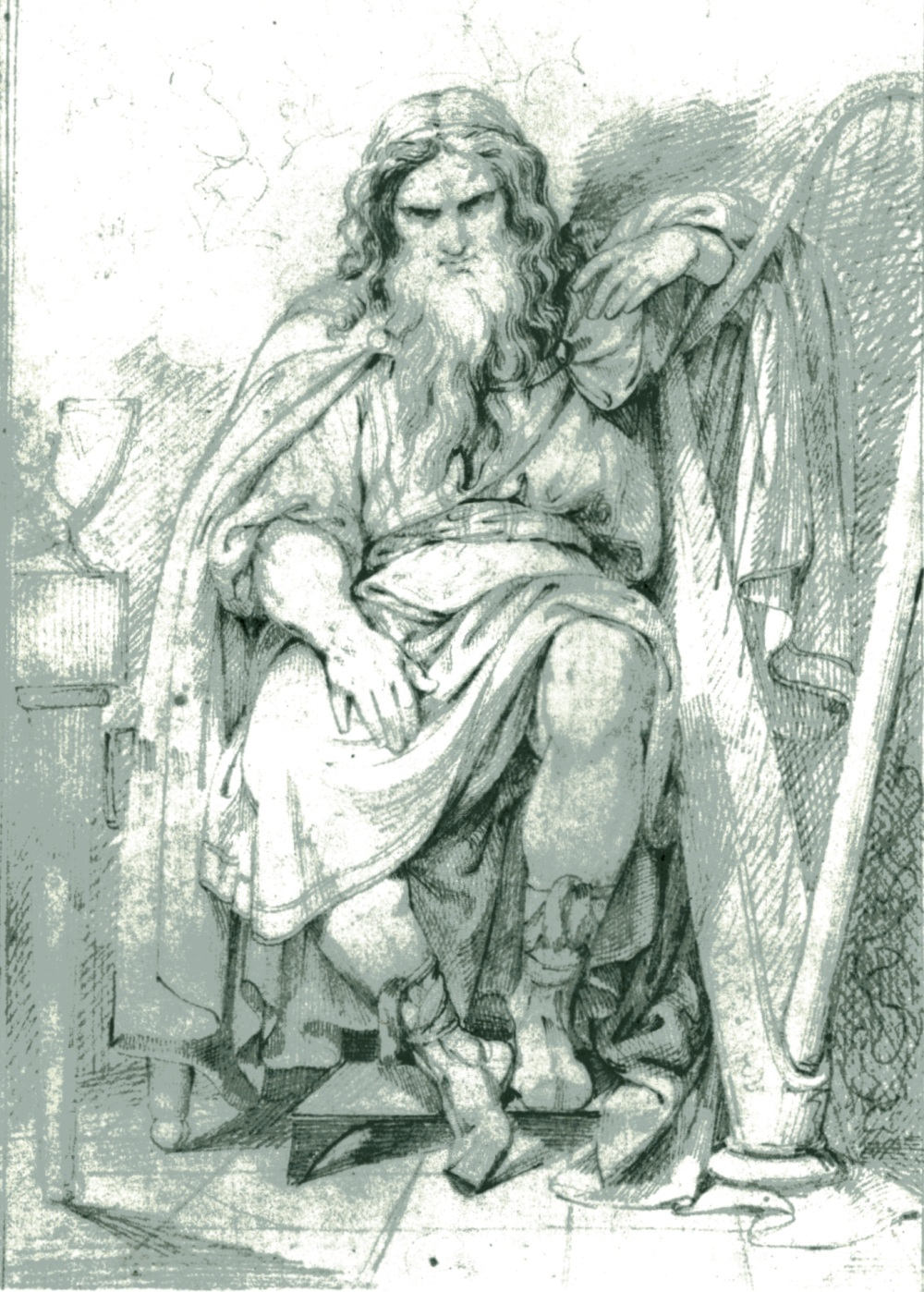
Bragi by Carl Wahlbom (1810–1858).

In Gylfaginning, Snorri Sturluson names the god Bragi as the figure among the Æsir whose special concern was poetry:

There is one [of the Æsir] called Bragi. He is renowned for wisdom and especially for eloquence and command of language. Especially he is knowledgeable about poetry, and because of him poetry is called brag, and from his name a person is said to be a brag [chief] of men or women who has eloquence beyond others, whether it is a woman or a man. Idunn is his wife.

— Snorri, Prose Edda, Gylfaginning, 25–7, transl. by A. Faulkes

==== Skáldskaparmál ====
The first part of Snorri's Skáldskaparmál (56–7, 58–1) is a dialogue between Ægir and Bragi about the nature of poetry, particularly skaldic poetry. Bragi tells the origin of the mead of poetry from the blood of Kvasir and how Odin obtained this mead. He then goes on to discuss various poetic metaphors known as kennings.

Later in Skáldskaparmál Snorri writes:

How shall Bragi be referred to? By calling him Idunn’s husband, inventor of poetry (brag) and the long-bearded As. It is from his name that the expression ‘beard-bragi’ comes for someone who has a big beard. Also son of Odin.

— Snorri, Prose Edda, Skáldskaparmál, 8–16, transl. by A. Faulkes

=== Skaldic poetry ===
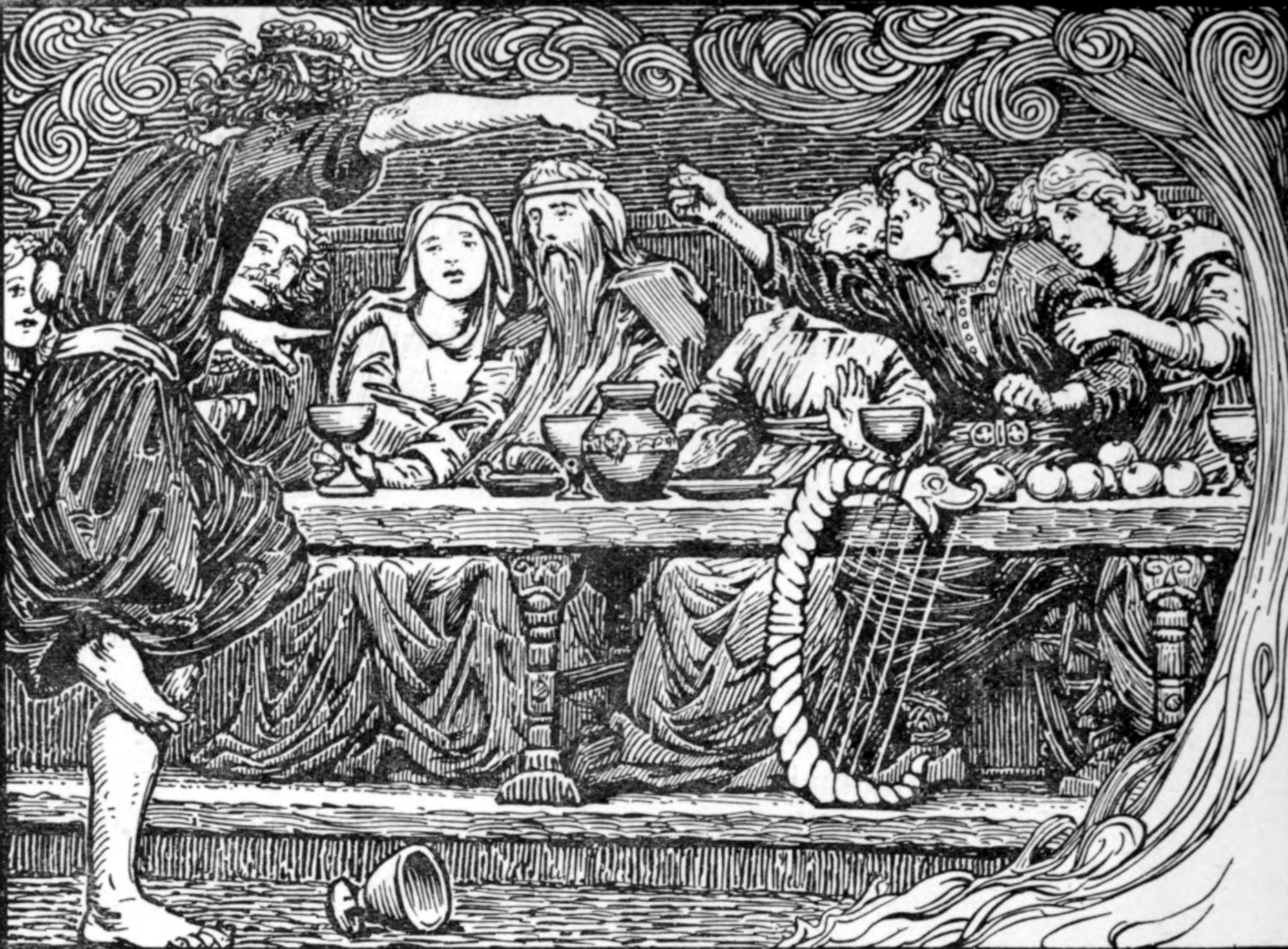
Loki Taunts Bragi (1908) by W. G. Collingwood.

In Eiríksmál, Odin, seated in Valhalla, hears the approach of the slain Norwegian king Eiríkr Bloodaxe and his retinue and commands the heroes Sigmundr and Sinfjötli to rise and greet him. Bragi then speaks, asking how Odin knows that the newcomer is Eiríkr and why he has allowed such a king to fall.

The wise Bragi should not speak foolishly,

for you know well what is happening:

For Erik this noise is made, as he here will come in;

the prince into Odin's halls!

— Gunnhild, Eiríksmál

In Hákonarmál, Hákon the Good is taken to Valhalla by the valkyrie Göndul and Odin sends Hermóðr and Bragi to greet him. In these poems Bragi could be either a god or a dead hero in Valhalla. Attempting to decide is further confused because Hermóðr also seems to be sometimes the name of a god and sometimes the name of a hero. That Bragi was also the first to speak to Loki in the Lokasenna as Loki attempted to enter the hall might be a parallel. It might have been useful and customary that a man of great eloquence and versed in poetry should greet those entering a hall. He is also depicted in tenth-century court poetry of helping to prepare Valhalla for new arrivals and welcoming the kings who have been slain in battle to the hall of Odin.

‘Hermod and Bragi,’ said Hropta-Tyr [Odin], ‘go to meet

the prince, for a king is coming who is to be considered a

hero, here to this hall.’

— Eyvindr, Hákonarmál, transl. by A. Faulkes

In Höfuðlausn, the skald Egill Skallagrímsson (10th century AD) concludes with the words:

May he [Erik Bloodaxe, the addressee of the Höfuðlausn] enjoy wealth, as Bragi [enjoyed] the eye [of Odin]

— Egill, Höfuðlausn

The attribution of this epode to Egill himself is generally disputed. The allusion is usually understood as referring to the myth of Odin's one-eyedness and his initiation to wisdom at Mímir, and Bragi may be seen here as an alternative name of Odin.

== Interpretations ==
=== Deified human skald ===
Because Bragi appears in the skaldic poems Hákonarmál and Eiríksmál as a resident of Valhalla who receives deceased human kings, most scholars interpret this role as reflecting a poetic representation of the 9th-century skald Bragi Boddason, who is traditionally regarded as the first skald. The latter may have been imagined as a highly venerated human poet who, after death, was elevated to Valhalla. On this view, the figure Bragi from in these poems can be interpreted as a heavenly prototype of the god Bragi later attested in the Prose and Poetic Edda, the sublimated model of the skaldic praise-poet, and the first stage in the rapid metamorphosis from poet to god.

The god Bragi of the Eddas is therefore generally regarded in scholarship as a later construct developed through the elevation of the historical skald Bragi Boddason to divine status. His portfolio as a god was connected to skaldic poetry, in contrast to Odin, who presided over poetry in general. From this perspective, Bragi would not reflect an inherited pre-Christian cult, but rather a process of systematizing and reinterpreting Germanic mythology by medieval Icelandic scholars. In support of this view, Heinz Klingenberg observes that Bragi is securely attested as a god only in post-pagan sources, and that although Lokasenna (c. 1200 AD) addresses him as a god (áss), its wording may allow the interpretation that Bragi was conceived as an adoptive son of Odin.

Such a development would necessarily predate the attestations in the Poetic Edda, although the relative chronology cannot be established with certainty. Margaret Clunies Ross and Klingenberg have suggested that Bragi Boddason's apotheosis occurred in the (late) 10th century, prior to the introduction of Christianity. Eugen Mogk thought that it took place as early as the late 9th century, shortly after his death. Jan de Vries, however, considered a transformation into a divine figure during the final decades of paganism unlikely, a view shared by Sophus Bugge, who thought that the timing was too short.

=== Personification of praise-poetry ===
Jan de Vries proposed to interpret Bragi as a mythological representation of praise-poetry rather than as a poet-god in a narrow sense. In Indo-European societies, the praise-poet occupied a structurally important role, capable both of conferring honour and of inflicting social damage through satire. Bragi's association with Odin, his intervention in Lokasenna to curb Loki's verbal hostility, and his link with Iðunn may be understood as reflecting this broader function of regulated, life-affirming speech, through which social order, prestige, and royal authority were ritually maintained.

=== Fertility god ===
Another interpretation proposed by Jan de Vries understands Bragi's association with Iðunn, the goddess of rejuvenating apples, as pointing to an origin in growth and fertility cults. By linking Bragi to bragr in the sense of 'poetry' (itself likely etymologically related to Old Indic bráhmaṇ- 'sacrificial hymn'), de Vries argues that Bragi may have emerged as a deity of renewed life. In this role, hero cult, fertility cult, and life-creating speech often converge, with Bragi being compared with other fertility figures bearing titles meaning 'lord' or 'prince, such as Freyr. Heinz Klingenberg, however, considers such conclusions speculative, arguing that Bragi's association with Iðunn may simply reflect the complementary role between Bragi's life-giving, imperishable word and the goddess of rejuvenation, rather than an ancient fertility cult.

== Skalds named Bragi ==
=== Bragi Boddason ===
In the Prose Edda Snorri Sturluson quotes many stanzas attributed to Bragi Boddason the old (Bragi Boddason inn gamli), a Norwegian court poet who served several Swedish kings, Ragnar Lodbrok, Östen Beli and Björn at Hauge who reigned in the first half of the 9th century. This Bragi was reckoned as the first skaldic poet, and was certainly the earliest skaldic poet then remembered by name whose verse survived in memory.

Snorri especially quotes passages from Bragi's Ragnarsdrápa, a poem supposedly composed in honor of the famous legendary Viking Ragnar Lodbrok ('Hairy-breeches') describing the images on a decorated shield which Ragnar had given to Bragi. The images included Thor's fishing for Jörmungandr, Gefjun's ploughing of Zealand from the soil of Sweden, the attack of Hamdir and Sorli against King Jörmunrekk, and the never-ending battle between Hedin and Högni.

=== Bragi son of Hálfdan the Old ===
Bragi son of Hálfdan the Old is mentioned only in the Skjáldskaparmál. This Bragi is the sixth of the second of two groups of nine sons fathered by King Hálfdan the Old on Alvig the Wise, daughter of King Eymund of Hólmgard. This second group of sons are all eponymous ancestors of legendary families of the north. Snorri says:

Bragi, from whom the Bragnings are sprung (that is the race of Hálfdan the Generous).

Of the Bragnings as a race and of Hálfdan the Generous nothing else is known. However, Bragning is often, like some others of these dynastic names, used in poetry as a general word for 'king' or 'ruler'.

=== Bragi Högnason ===
In the eddic poem Helgakviða Hundingsbana II, Bragi Högnason, his brother Dag, and his sister Sigrún were children of Högne, the king of East Götaland. The poem relates how Sigmund's son Helgi Hundingsbane agreed to take Sigrún daughter of Högni as his wife against her unwilling betrothal to Hodbrodd son of Granmar the king of Södermanland. In the subsequent battle of Frekastein (probably one of the 300 hill forts of Södermanland, as stein meant "hill fort") against Högni and Granmar, all the chieftains on Granmar's side are slain, including Bragi, except for Bragi's brother Dag.

== In popular culture ==
In the 2002 Ensemble Studios game Age of Mythology, Bragi is one of nine minor gods Norse players can worship.
