= Hlidskjalf =

In Norse mythology high seat of Odin

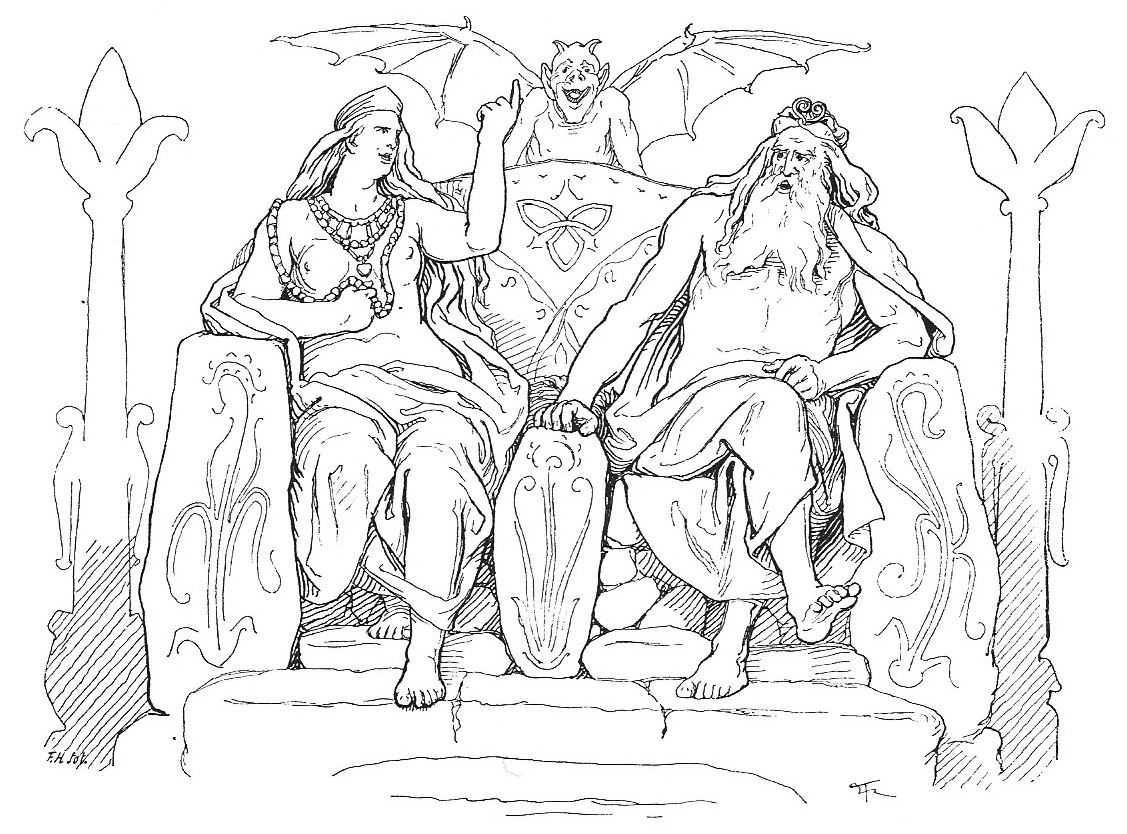
Frigg and Odin wagering upon Hliðskjálf in Grímnismál (1895) by Lorenz Frølich

In Norse mythology, the Hliðskjálf (literally meaning the high seat with an expansive view) allowed Odin to see into all realms as well as listen to them.

Although not explicit in any surviving source, there may be a connection between Hliðskjálf and the art of seiðr, a type of magic said to be practiced by Odin that was often performed from a high, raised platform called a seiðhjallr. The works of Rudolf Simek suggest that Hliðskjálf could be the model that actual seiðhjallr platforms attempted to emulate.

== Poetic Edda ==
In Grímnismál, Odin and Frigg are both sitting in Hliðskjálf when they see their foster sons Agnarr and Geirröðr, one living in a cave with a giantess and the other a king. Frigg then made the accusation to her husband that Geirröðr was miserly and inhospitable toward guests, so after wagering with one another over the veracity of the statement, Odin set out to visit Geirröðr in order to settle the matter.

In Skírnismál, Freyr sneaks into Hliðskjálf when he looks into Jötunheimr and sees the beautiful giant maiden Gerðr, with whom he instantly falls in love.

== Prose Edda ==
In Gylfaginning, Snorri mentions the high seat on four occasions. In the first instance he seems to refer to it rather as a dwelling place: "There is one abode called Hliðskjálf, and when Allfather sat in the high seat there, he looked out over the whole world and saw every man's acts, and knew all things which he saw."

However, later he explicitly refers to it as the high seat itself: "Another great abode is there, which is named Valaskjálf. Odin possesses that dwelling. The gods made it and thatched it with sheer silver, and in this hall is the Hliðskjálf, the high seat so called. Whenever Allfather sits in that seat, he surveys all lands."

The third mention made of Hliðskjálf is during Snorri's recounting of the wooing of Gerd, quoted by him from Skírnismál. Lastly, Snorri relates how Odin used the high seat to find Loki after he fled from the scene of his murder of Baldr.

It is described to be inside the throne room of Valaskjálf Odin's home. It said upon it that Odin looks upon his world.

== See also ==
- Öndvegissúlur
- Valaskjálf
