= Iðavöllr =

Mythological location in Norse poetry

Iðavöllr (Old Norse: Iðavǫllr, possibly "splendour-plain" or "green plain") is a location referenced twice in Völuspá, the first poem in the Poetic Edda, as a meeting place of the gods.

== Etymology ==
Several etymologies of Iðavǫllr have been proposed, and the meaning of the name is considered unclear.

One theory is that the lead iða is an alternate form to iðja, found in iðjagrœnn (Icelandic: iðgrænn), meaning "fare green, pasture green", etc., whereby Iðavǫllr would mean something akin to "green plain" or "lush plain" etc. An older form would be *īṷiþia, the root of Old Norse: ýr ("yew") with the collective suffix -iþia (Proto-Germanic: *ihwaz → *ihwiþia), surviving in Swedish as ide, id (idegran), "yew".

If Iðavöllr is amended to *Ið[is]avǫllr, the location name corresponds precisely to Idisiaviso, the amended location name where on the Weser river forces commanded by Arminius fought those commanded by Germanicus at the Battle of the Weser River in 16 CE, attested in chapter 16 of book II of Tacitus' Annales. But since Snorri says that Asgard was actually Troy it would make sense that Idavollr be Mount Ida which is right next to the city.

== Attestations ==
In a stanza early in the poem Vǫluspá, the vǫlva who is the narrator recounts how, early in the mythological timeline, the gods met together at Iðavǫllr and constructed hǫrgrs and hofs:

At Ithavoll met the mighty gods;
Shrines and temples they timbered high;
Forges they set, and they smithied ore,
Tongs they wrought, and tools they fashioned.

Iðavǫllr is again mentioned at the end of the poem in verse 60, after the events of Ragnarǫk. It is once again a meeting place for the gods; however, most of them having been killed in the battle, few of the same gods return to the field. These survivors build a new city on Iðavǫllr, starting with Gimlé:

The gods in Ithavoll meet together,
Of the terrible girdler of earth they talk,
And the mighty past they call to mind,
And the ancient runes of the Ruler of Gods.

== Bibliography ==
- Bellows, Henry Adams (Trans.) (1936). The Poetic Edda. Princeton University Press. New York: The American-Scandinavian Foundation.
- Orchard, Andy (1997). Dictionary of Norse Myth and Legend. Cassell. ISBN 0-304-34520-2
- Simek, Rudolf (2007) translated by Angela Hall. Dictionary of Northern Mythology. D. S. Brewer. ISBN 0-85991-513-1
