= Hörgr =

Type of altar or cult site, possibly consisting of a heap of stones

A hǫrgr (Old Norse, pl. hǫrgar) or hearg (Old English, pl. heargas) is a type of altar or cult site, possibly consisting of a heap of stones, used in Norse religion, as opposed to a roofed hall used as a hof (temple).

The Old Norse term is attested in both the Poetic Edda and the Prose Edda, in the sagas of Icelanders, skaldic poetry, and with its Old English cognate in Beowulf. The word is also reflected in various place names (in English placenames as harrow), often in connection with Germanic deities.

== Etymology ==
Old Norse hǫrgr means "altar, sanctuary", while Old English hearg refers to a "holy grove; temple, idol". From these, and the Old High German cognate harug, Proto-Germanic *harugaz has been reconstructed, possibly cognate with Insular Celtic carrac "cliff".

== Old Norse tradition ==
=== Literary ===
The term hǫrgr is used three times in poems collected in the Poetic Edda. In a stanza early in the poem Vǫluspá, the vǫlva says that early in the mythological timeline, the gods met together at the location of Iðavǫllr and constructed a hǫrgr and a hof:

Old Norse: Hittoz æsir á Iðavelli, þeir er hǫrg ok hof hátimbroðo.	Henry Adams Bellows translation: At Ithavoll met the mighty gods; Shrines and temples they timbered high;	Ursula Dronke translation: Æsir met on Eddying Plain they who built towering altars and temples.

In the poem Vafþrúðnismál Gagnráðr (the god Odin in disguise) engages in a game of wits with the jǫtunn Vafþrúðnir. Gagnráðr asks Vafþrúðnir whence the Van god Njǫrðr came, for though he rules over many hofs and hǫrgar, Njǫrðr was not raised among the Æsir (Benjamin Thorpe here glosses hǫrgr with "offer-steads" and Bellows glosses with "shrines"):

Benjamin Thorpe translation:

Tell me tenthly, since thou all the origin
of the gods knowest, Vafthrudnir!
whence Niörd came among the Æsir's sons?
O'er fanes and offer-steads he rules by hundreds,
yet he was not among the Æsir born.

Henry Adams Bellows translation:

Tenth answer me now, if thou knowest all
The fate that is fixed for the gods:
Whence came up Njorth to the kin of the gods,—
(Rich in temples and shrines he rules,—)
Though of gods he was never begot?

In the poem Hyndluljóð, the goddess Freyja speaks favorably of Óttar for having worshiped her so faithfully by using a hǫrgr. Freyja details that the hǫrgr is constructed of a heap of stones, and that Óttar very commonly reddened these stones with sacrificial blood (Thorpe glosses hǫrgr with "offer-stead", Bellows with "shrine", and Orchard with "altar"):

Benjamin Thorpe translation: An offer-stead to me he raised, with stones constructed; now is the stone as glass become. With the blood of oxen he newly sprinkled it. Ottar ever trusted the Asyniur.	Henry Adams Bellows translation: For me a shrine of stones he made, And now to glass the rock has grown; Oft with the blood of beasts was it red; In the goddesses ever did Ottar trust.	Andy Orchard translation: He made me a high altar of heaped-up stones: the gathered rocks have grown all bloody, and he reddened them again with the fresh blood of cows; Ottar has always had faith in the ásynjur.

=== Epigraphic ===
The place name Salhøgum, that is mentioned on a 9th-century Danish runestone known as the Snoldelev Stone, has a literal translation which combines Old Norse sal meaning "hall" with hǫrgar "mounds," to form "on the hall mounds," suggesting a place with a room where official meetings took place. The inscription states that the man Gunnvaldr is the þulaR of Salhøgum, which has been identified as referring to the modern town Salløv, located in the vicinity of the original site of the runestone.

=== Toponymy ===
Many place names in Iceland and Scandinavia contain the word hǫrgr, such as Hörgá and Hörgsdalur in Iceland and Harg in Sweden. When Willibrord Christianized the Netherlands (~700 AD) the church of Vlaardingen had a dependency in Harago/Hargan, currently named Harga. This indicates that near those places there was some kind of religious building in medieval times.

== Old English tradition ==
In the interpretation of Wilson, Anglo-Saxon Paganism (1992), hearg refers to "a special type of religious site, one that occupied a prominent position on high land and was a communal place of worship for a specific group of people, a tribe or folk group, perhaps at particular times of the year", while a weoh, by contrast, was merely a small shrine by the wayside.

Beowulf has the compound hærgtrafum in the so-called "Christian excursus" (lines 175–178a), translated as "tabernacles of idols" by Hall (1950).

Following the regular evolution of English phonology, Old English hearg has become harrow in modern English placenames (unrelated to the homophone harrow "agricultural implement"). The London Borough of Harrow derives its name from a temple on Harrow Hill, where St. Mary's Church stands today. The name of Harrow on the Hill (Harewe atte Hulle) was adopted into Latin as Herga super montem; the Latinized form of the Old English name is preserved in the name of Herga Road in Harrow.
