= Saltfleetby spindle-whorl =

Runic spindle-whorl

Saltfleetby spindle-whorl (E18)
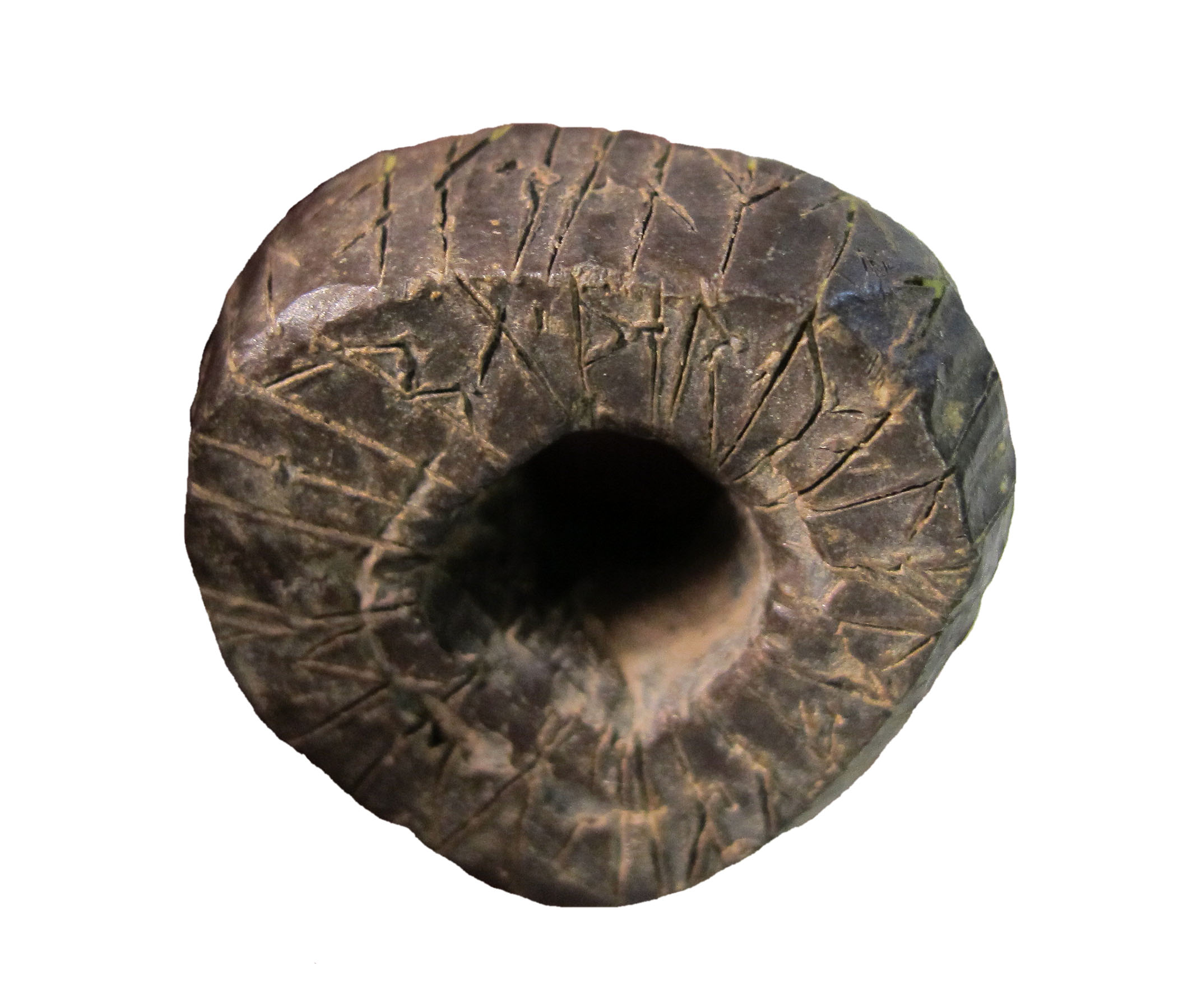
- Material: Lead
- Size: 26 × 25 × 12 mm
- Weight: 49.72 grams (1.754 oz)
- Writing: Old Norse in Younger Fuþark
- Created: c. 10th–12th centuries CE
- Discovered: 1 September 2010; Saltfleetby, United Kingdom
- Discovered by: Denise Moncaster
- Present location: Private collection
- Identification: LIN-D92A22, E18

The Saltfleetby spindle-whorl (Rundata: E18) is a lead spindle-whorl uncovered in Lincolnshire in England of an Anglo-Scandinavian style typical of the 10th century. It is notable for its Younger Fuþark inscription that has been interpreted as invoking help from beings including the gods Óðinn and Heimdallr. The language and rune forms used have been dated to the 11th to 12th centuries, after the Christianisation of England. The implications of the find are debated, with it being noted that while appealing to Germanic gods is not mutually exclusive with upholding of Christian worldviews and customs, the find may nonetheless reflect continue adherence to Old Nordic religion.

== Discovery ==
The object was found by Mrs Denise Moncaster while metal detecting around Saltfleetby, who reported the find, having it recorded with the Portable Antiquities Scheme.

== Physical description and inscriptions ==
The spindle-whorl is shaped more like a curved triangle than a circle, which may have helped spin it by finger when on a spindle. It consists of a walled part with a conical and flat section either side and a 7–8 mm vertical hole through its middle. The flat section likely faced upwards when in use. The spindle-whorl is of the Form A1 typology in Penelope Walton Rogers' classification system, typical of Anglo-Scandinavian contexts. While it could have been made in Scandinavia, eastern England is much more likely.

The runes are almost entirely long-branch variants of Younger Fuþark and consist of a mixture of older and later forms, with it featuring two variants introduced by the 24-character expanded fuþark that became established during the Christian Middle Ages in Scandinavia and mirrors the Latin alphabet. Around the wall of the item, a small cross has also been carved which is partially covered by an r. Based on the broadly long-branch rune forms, John Hines interprets the writing as being Danish in character. Judith Jesch, however, favours arguments for a continuum of rune forms rather than a strict split between long and short branches, and stresses the inscriptions linguistic similarities with Norwegian finds.

== Translation ==
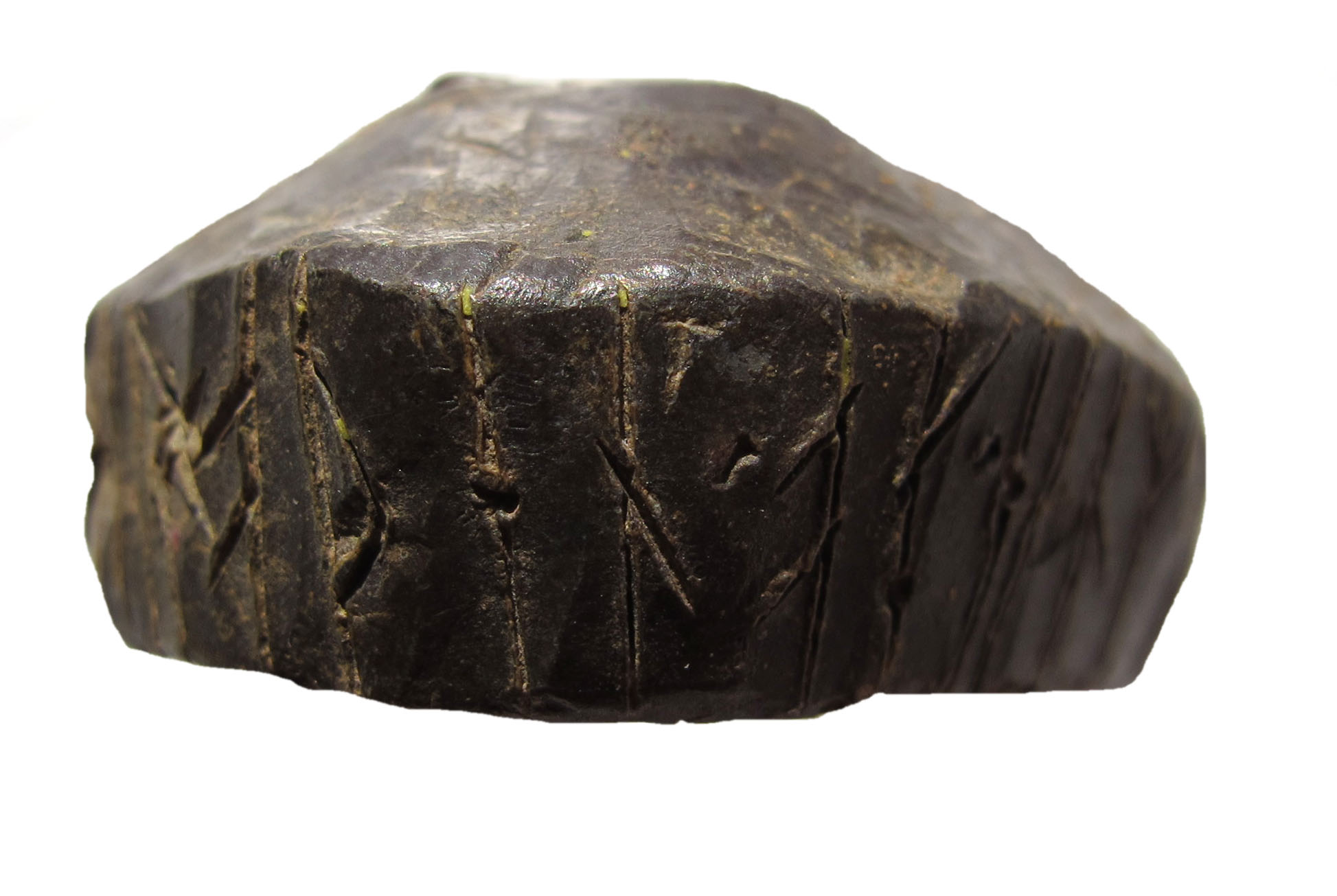
View of the inscription on the wall, showing the word ᚮᚦᛂᚿ (interpreted as Óðinn)

The inscription around the spindle-whorl wall is clear and is likely the beginning, while reading the runes on the face is more problematic. The following transcription, transliteration, normalisation and translation is proposed, in which the end is unclear and A and B correspond to the inscriptions around the wall of the whorl and on the flat face of the whorl respectively: (Note: The transcription is not given by Hines in his work, but proposed by Jesch based on Hines’ drawings and commentary, along with photographs of the find. Due to Unicode limitations, the presented transcription does not distinguish between rune forms with straight and curved lines. For a more full transcription, see Jesch 2020.)

A x ᚮᚦᛂᚿ ᛫ ᚮᚴ ᛫ ᛂᛁᚿᛘᛏᛆᛚᚱ ᛫ ᚮᚴ᛬ᚦᛆᛚᚠᛆ ᛫ ᚦᛂᛁᚱ
B ᛁᛂᛚᛒᛆ ᛫ ᚦᛂᚱᚢᚮᛚᚠᛚ(ᛏ) ' (ᚮ)ᚴ ' ᚴᛁᚱᛁᚢᛂᛋᚠ

A × oþen ᛫ ok ᛫ einmtalr ᛫ ok ᛬ þalfa ᛫ þeir
B (᛫) ielba ᛫ þeruolflt ᛫ ok ᛫ kiriuesf

Óðinn ok Heimdallr ok Þalfa, þeir hjálpa þér Ulfljót ok . . .
Óðinn and Heimdallr and Þalfa, they are helping you, Úlfljót, and . . .

Hines interprets the first and second names as the gods Óðinn and Heimdallr respectively. The identity or meaning of Þalfa is unclear though it has been noted to closely resemble Þjálfi, the name of a servant boy recorded in the Eddas. Whilst some runestones use similar spellings to write the name Þjálfi, the grammatical form given by Þalfa would not make sense in its context on the spindle-whorl. Hines nonetheless thinks that it being a personal name is the most likely option, noting that whilst the ending suggests a feminine name, the following word þeir is masculine and suggests that all three of the names referenced on the wall of the object are similarly masculine.

On the second line, uolflt is interpreted as the feminine name Úlfljót, whose masculine form was given to Úlfljótr, the first law-speaker for Iceland's Alþingi. The last 8 runes (kiriuesf) are unclear in meaning and have yet to be translated with confidence. kiri is found in inscriptions, for example as a form of the verb gøra ("to do", "to make"), however there are no word dividers between it and the uesf, which is unclear in meaning. There is a possibility of the f standing for a whole word, possibly giving the meaning Vés f[rændi] ("vé's kinsman"), however Hines considers none of the potential readings to be recommended. He further notes that the end of the inscription is likely meaningful as whilst the last runes seem less carefully cut, they are large, suggesting the potential abbreviations and lack of clarity do not result from the writer running out of space on the object. Due to its cryptic form, it was possibly only understood by its maker and those who the maker shared the understanding with.

Jesch questions certain aspects of the translation, noting that the two definitive cases in which oþen is attested as a spelling of “Óðinn” are both from Bergen in Norway and date to the 12th and 14th centuries. It is further noted that the Viking Age Ribe skull fragment spells the name uþin. She also suggests that the inscription could instead be representing the name “Auðun” which is a relatively common name in English sources despite being rare in Old Danish and Old Swedish.

== Discussion ==
=== Dating ===
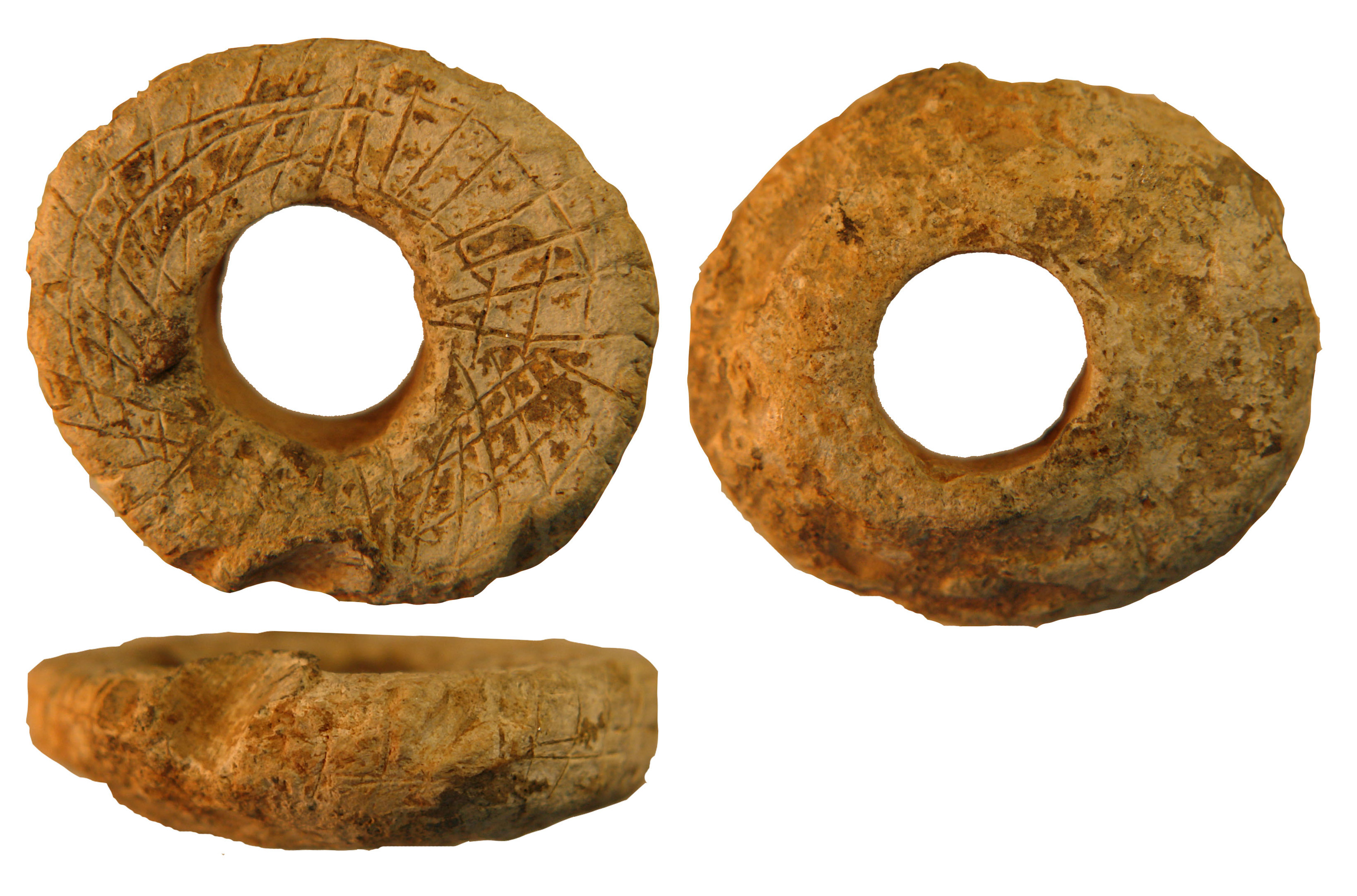
A spindle-whorl from Barton-upon-Humber in Lincolnshire of the same typology (Form A1).

Form A1, the spindle-whorl's typology, is dated to c. 600 – c. 1000, with those in York mainly dating to 10th century layers. In contrast, two of the rune forms are typically seen as later developments, first arising at the end of the 10th century and mid 11th centuries respectively.

Jesch notes that the spelling of the first name as oþen rather than uþin is consistent with a dating to after the Viking Age and a Norwegian context. If the translation of the next name as “Heimdallr” is correct, this spelling would also be consistent with a link with Norway. The use of an r instead of R further suggests a dating to at least the later Viking Age, with the two sounds converging earlier in western than eastern Scandinavia, leading to changes in spelling. The spelling of hjalpa as ielba is inconclusive in terms of dating the writing, given that the ‘’j’’-mutation it shows is attested in East Norse contexts in the Viking Age but from the 1200s in Norwegian manuscripts. . From this, Jesch proposes that the inscription is more likely to date from the 12th century, although notes that this is significantly later than the design would suggest and may imply that either the inscription was added at a later date or that the archaeological dating is inaccurate.

=== Language ===
The inscription likely records a woman with a fully Old Norse name and is written in Old Norse that is as correct and standard as inscriptions in Scandinavia, with later developments seen elsewhere featuring. This attests to a community speaking it in Lincolnshire at the time the inscription was made, possibly during the reign of Cnut. While a name of Óðinn resulting from the blending of Old English and Old Norse forms is attested in a 10th-century text, the spelling in the inscription is more consistent with a fully Old Norse form, lacking a "w" at the start of the word. (Note: The Old English form of the name is Wōden, whilst the spelling ‘’Vuothen’’ used in a 10th century Latin chronicle by Æthelweard has been interpreted as a blended form resulting from both Old English and Old Norse being used in the same area. 10th and early 11th century spellings in English works lacking the “w” include ‘’ Óðon’’ and ‘’Oðon’’ (used by Ælfric of Eynsham and Wulfstan) and ‘’Othan’’ (found in Historia de Sancto Cuthberto).)

=== Function and carver identity ===
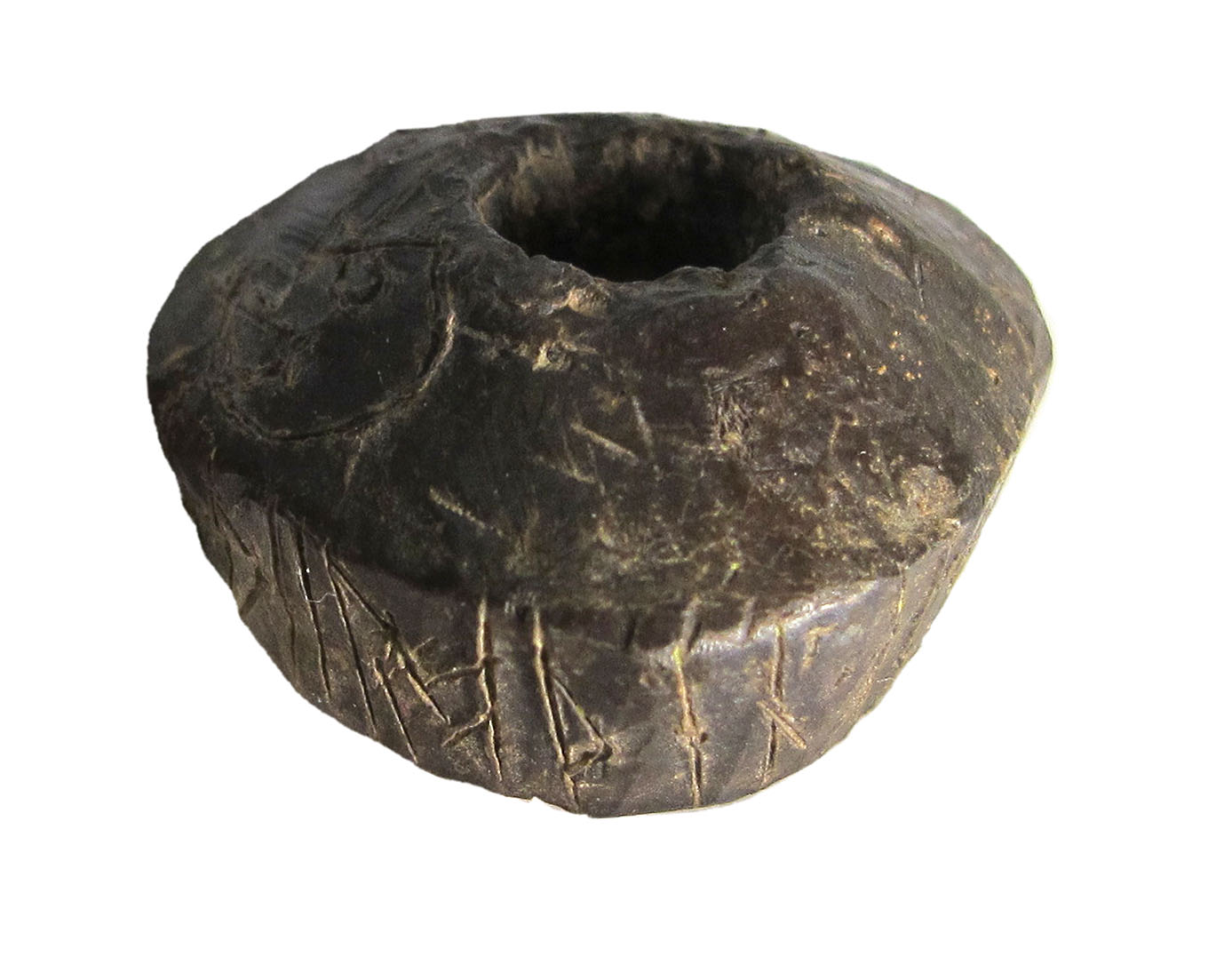
View of the conical section lacking runes.

The spindle-whorl is an everyday object from the household, and particularly female, sphere. This may suggest the owner was also female and it closely resembles other finds such as an 11th-century soapstone whorl from Aust-Agder in Norway with an inscription that reads kunitr kerþsnalt ("Gunnhildr made the spindle-whorl"), and one from East Yorkshire that has rune-like markings but cannot be read. Given the scarcity of comparative material, it is unclear whether the carver was a Scandinavian speaker from Lincolnshire or visiting Lincolnshire, however that the spindle-whorl fits into a type typical of the region, suggests a local nature for the carver. 12th century contacts between Lincolnshire and Norway are recorded, including in a writ from King Henry II that enforce the right to toll Norwegian merchants in Grimsby.

The charm calls for help from the Germanic gods, using the indicative tense rather than subjunctive ("they are helping" not "may they help"). It has been suggested that the spinning of the whorl during its use was believed to bring about the desired effect, making the statement a reality. This is likely an example of the "heathenism" criticised by Church figures such as Ælfric of Eynsham and Wulfstan in the Late Anglo-Saxon period. Hines notes that it is surprising for an inscription dating from after the establishment of Christianity in England, Denmark and Norway to appeal to heathen gods. While the use of hjalpa (“to help”) in runic writing is almost exclusively found in Christian contexts, it does feature on the 8th century Ribe skull fragment, in which there is a close connection between the word (in this case spelt ʜiᴀlb) and the three names that come before it, including Óðinn. The widespread associations between Óðinn and spells suggests there was a strong belief that invoking his name gave efficacy to a charm or prayer. Beyond this close parallel, the spindle-whorl forms part of a wider Late Viking Age runic amulet tradition which is attested in finds from the Orkneys to Russia.

Jesch argues that it is unclear whether the carver was Christian or heathen as references to heathen gods exist from periods after the official conversion to Christianity of Scandinavia and the Scandinavian diaspora in places such as England. For example, Óðinn is named in Norwegian inscriptions from Bryggen, with one (N B380) calling upon Óðinn to reveal a thief's name fyr kristni ‘for (the sake of) Christianity’ and finishing with "Amen". The other (N B380), dating to the late 12th century, states “Heil(l) sé þú ok í hugum góðum. Þórr þik þiggi, Óðinn þik eigi.” (“May you be healthy and in good spirits. May Þórr receive you, may Óðinn own you.”) and has been noted to closely resemble the Saltfleetby spindle-whorl's inscription. A further argument against the reference to heathen gods necessarily meaning a heathen writer is that Christian stone carvings dating to the Viking Age from both England and Mann are thought to depict Óðinn and Heimdallr.

== Gallery ==
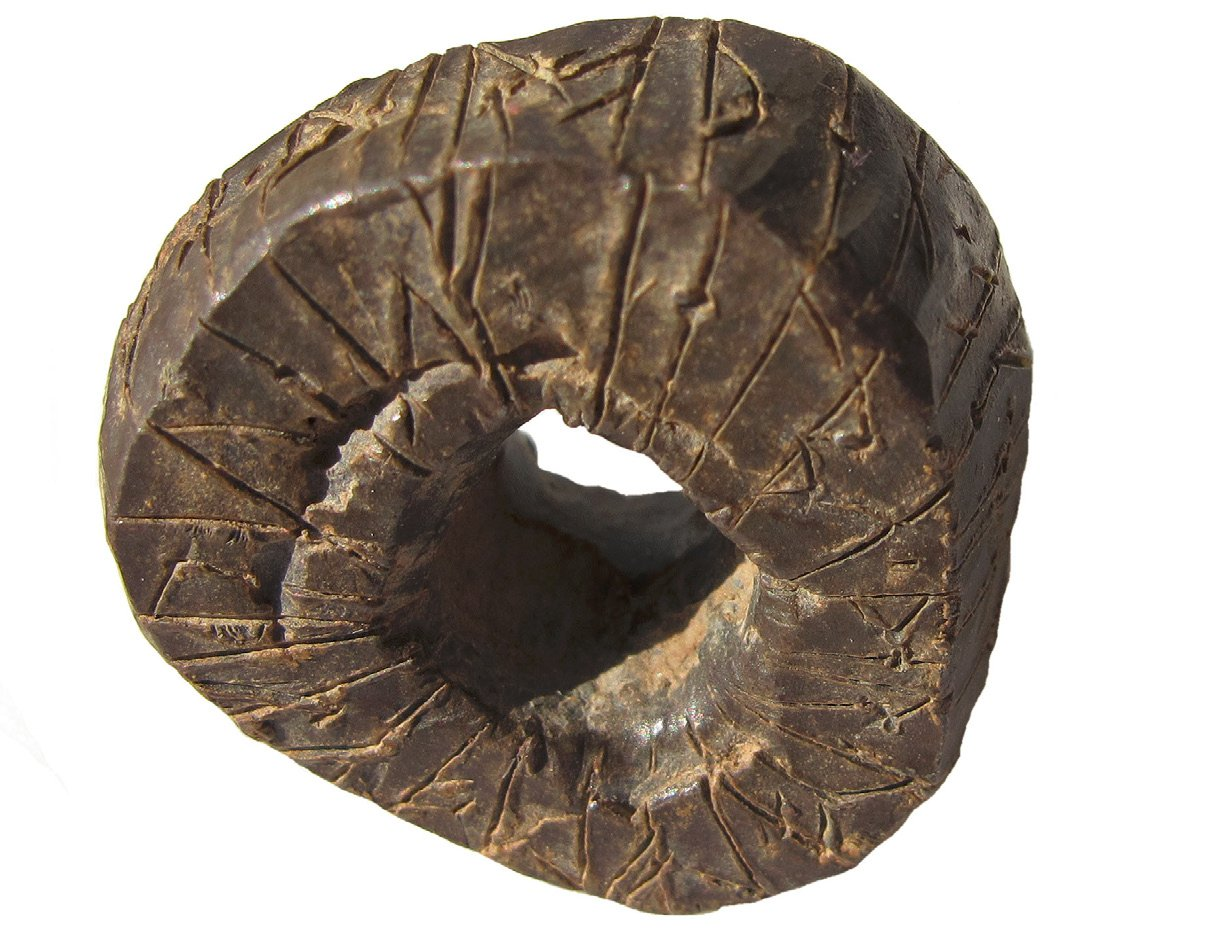

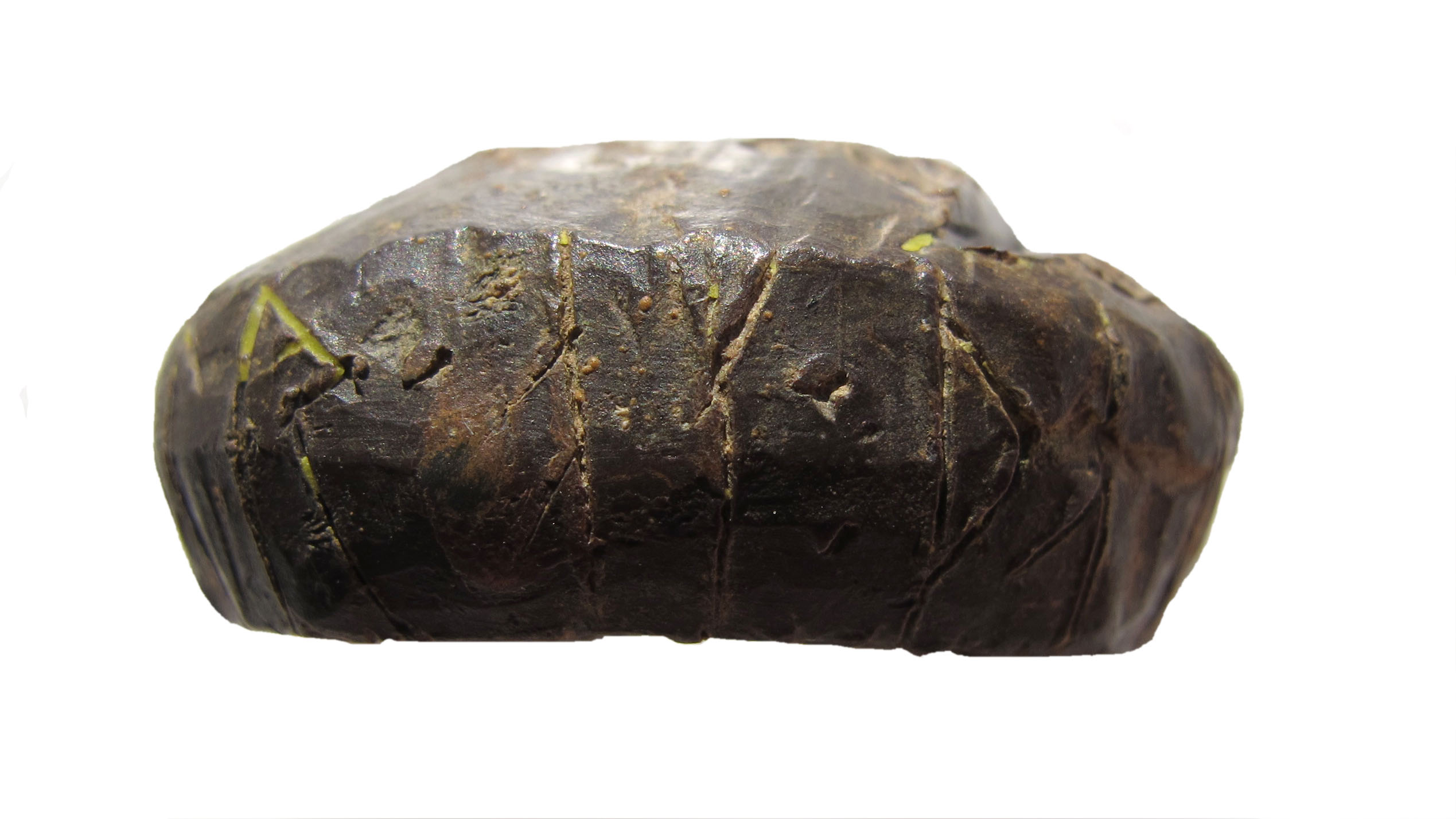

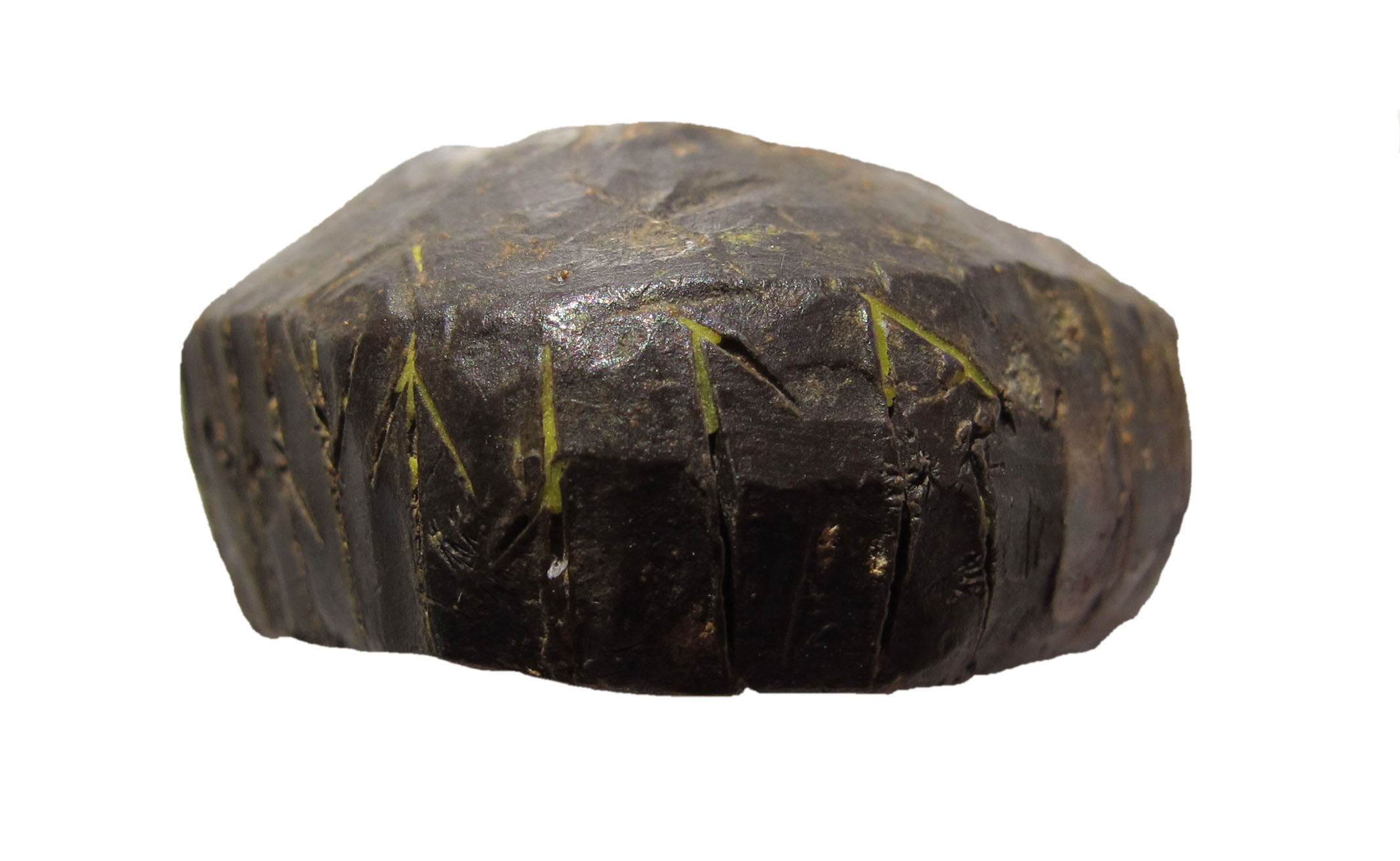

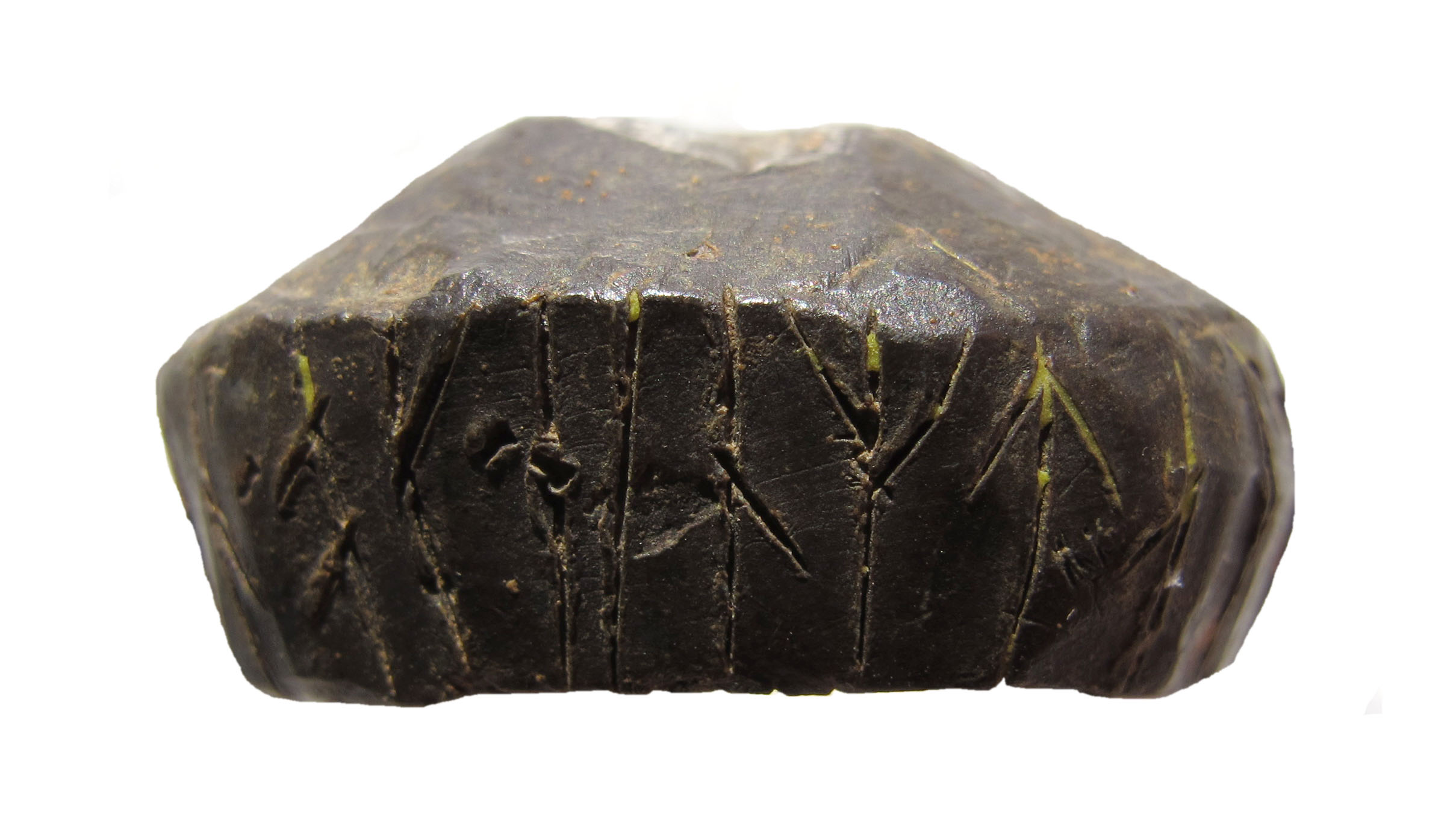

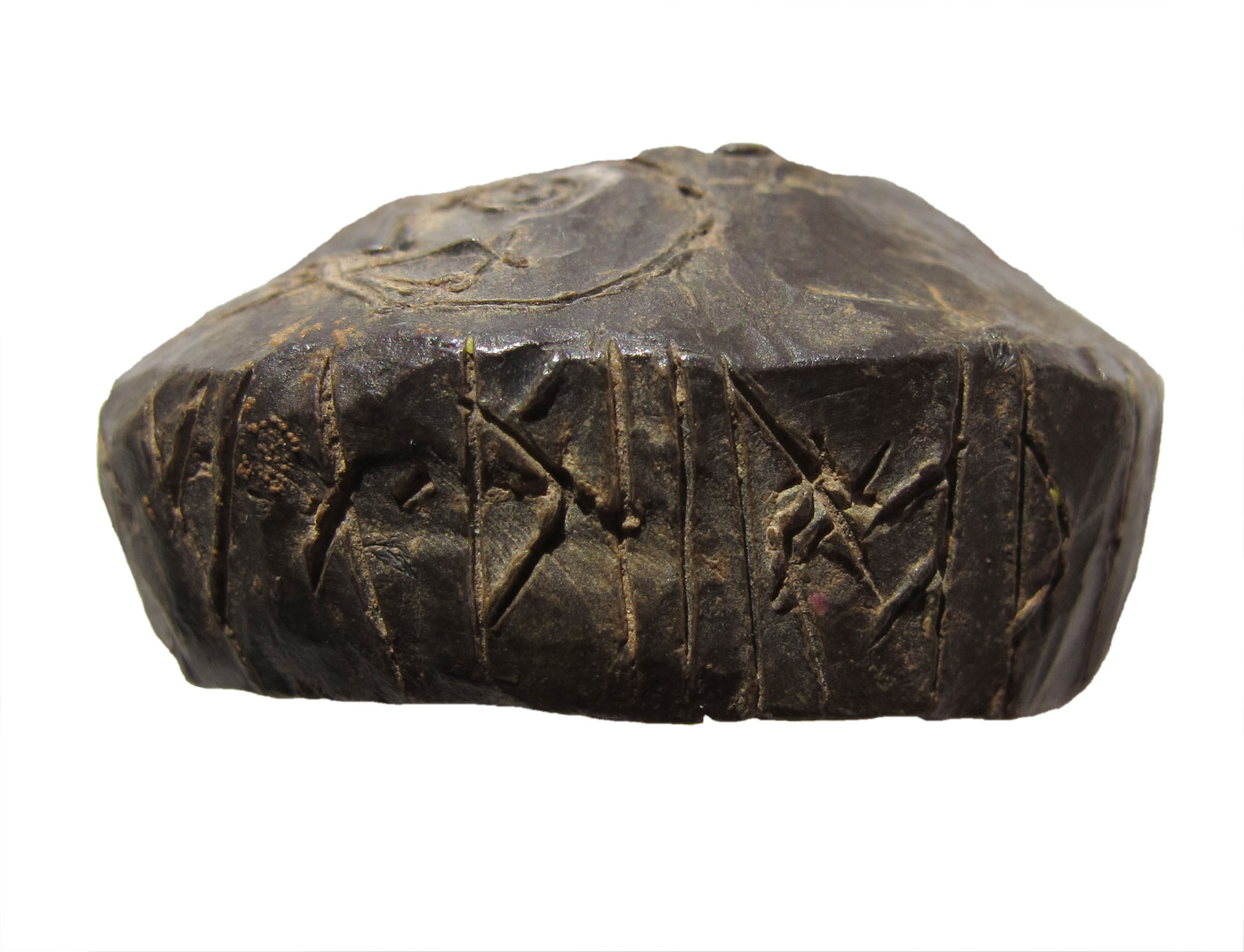

== See also ==
- Canterbury charm
- Near Fakenham plaque
- Kvinneby amulet
- Sigtuna amulet I

== Bibliography ==
=== Secondary ===
- Hines, John (2017). "A glimpse of the heathen Norse in Lincolnshire". Crossing boundaries: interdisciplinary approaches to the art, material culture, language and literature of the early medieval world: essays presented to Professor Emeritus Richard N. Bailey, OBE, on the occasion of his eightieth birthday. Oxbow Books. ISBN 978-1-78570-310-2. JSTOR j.ctt1s47569.
- Jesch, Judith (2020). "Further Thoughts on E18 Saltfleetby". Futhark: International Journal of Runic Studies. 9–10: 201–213. doi:10.33063/diva-401054.
- "Record ID: LIN-D92A22 - EARLY MEDIEVAL spindle whorl". The Portable Antiquities Scheme. Archived from the original on 19 April 2019.’‘‘
