= Sigtuna rib =

12th-century runic amulet from Sweden

Sigtuna rib (U NOR1998;25)
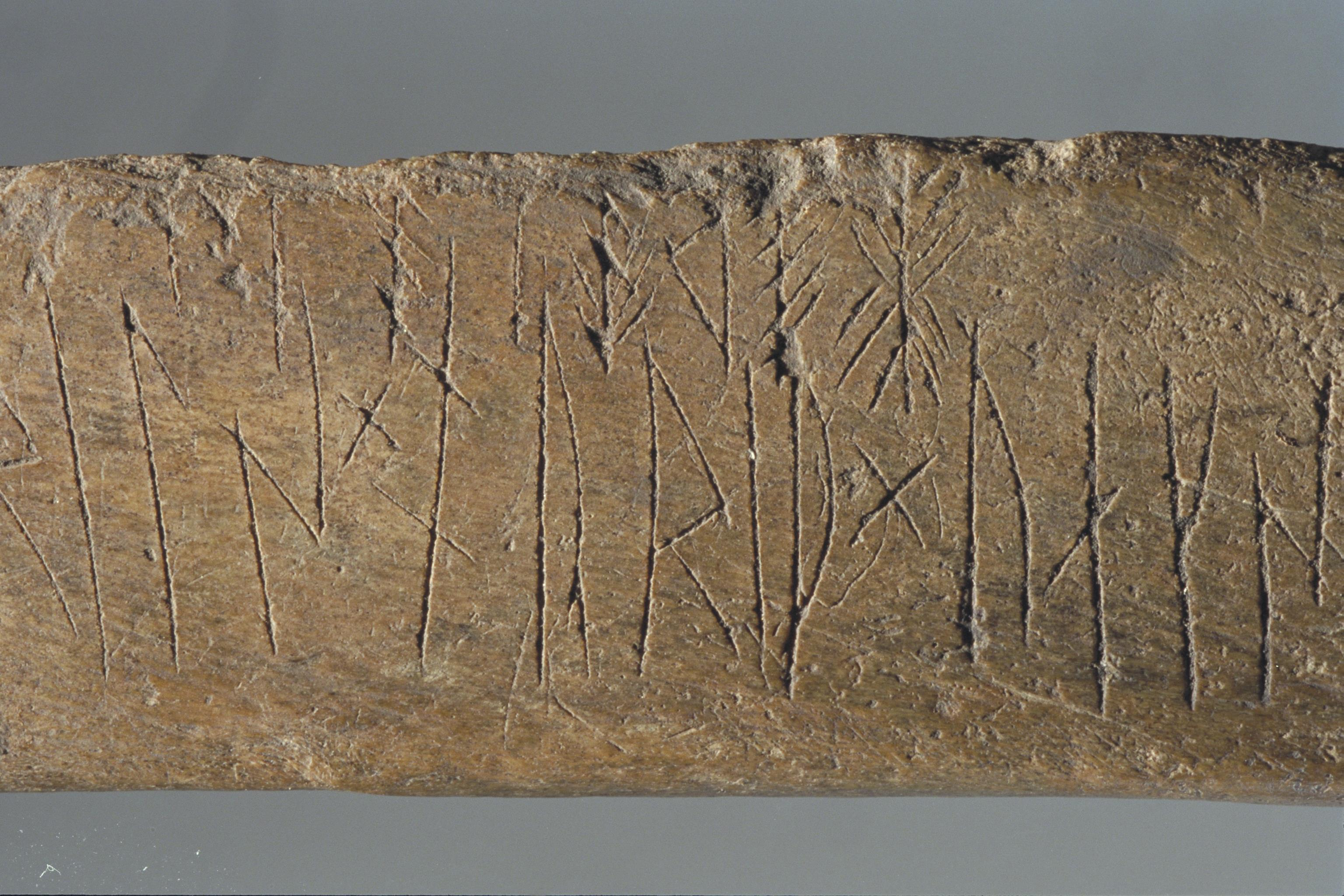
- Material: Bone
- Writing: Younger Futhark
- Created: 1100
- Discovered: 1998; Sigtuna, kv. Professorn 4
- Present location: 59.6158, 17.7213
- Culture: Norse
- Rundata ID: U NOR1998;25

Text – Native
- Old Norse: See article.

Translation
- See article.

The Sigtuna rib (signum U NOR1998;25) is a 12th-century runic amulet found in the 1990s in Sigtuna, Uppland, Sweden

== Description ==
The amulet is a rib bone with writing on both sides of it. The inscription appears to be a spell against disease.

== Inscription ==
The first line is a Transliteration. The second is an Old West Norse normalization, and the third Old East Norse normalization.

iorils × ouriþ × uaksna ur : kroke × bat han × riþu × bar-…
Jórils {} vrið!/óvrið {} vaksna ur {} Króki! {} Bant hann {} riðu, {} bar[ði](?)
Iōrils {} vrið!/ovrið {} vaksna uʀ {} Krōki! {} Bant hann {} riðu, {} bar[ði](?)
Jórill's woundcauser / Jórill's abnormal stomach-ache disappear from Krókr! He bound the fever, he fought(?)

han : riþu × aok × siþa × sarþ × sararan × uara × hafir × fult ¶ f(e)kit × fly : braot riþa
hann {} riðu. {} Ok {} síða(?) {} sarð {} sára-rann. {} Vara {} {hefir (hann)} {} fullt {} fengit. {} Flý {} braut riða!
hann {} riðu. {} Ok {} sīða(?) {} sarð {} sāra-rann. {} Vara {} {hafiʀ (hann)} {} fullt {} fængit. {} Flȳ {} braut riða!
the fever. And did away with the abscess. (He) has fully caught the pus. Flee away, fever!

== See also ==
- Canterbury charm
- Kvinneby amulet
- Near Fakenham plaque
- Ribe skull fragment
- Sigtuna amulet I
