= Against a dwarf =

Curative Anglo-Saxon charms

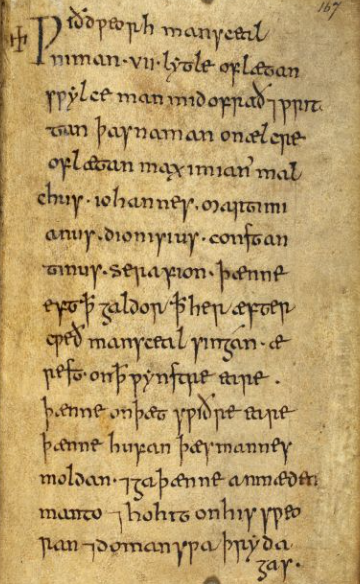
First page of the XCIIIb charm, from the Lacnunga collection

Three Anglo-Saxon metrical charms "Against a dwarf" (Old English: Wið dweorh) are contained within the Lacnunga, which seek to heal an afflicted person by ridding them of a dwarf.

== Charms ==
=== Remedies LXXXVIIc and LXXXVIIIc ===
The remedies LXXXVIIc and LXXXVIIIc consist of writing Christian symbols, such as crosses and both Latin and Greek letters, along the arms of the sick person. This is then followed by mixing grated celandine (Note: The source does not specify whether this refers to chelidonium majus (greater celandine) or ficaria verna (lesser celandine), both of which are native to Europe and used in herbal remedies.) with ale and invoking the names of saints, including the Welsh Saint Macutus.

=== Remedy XCIIIb ===
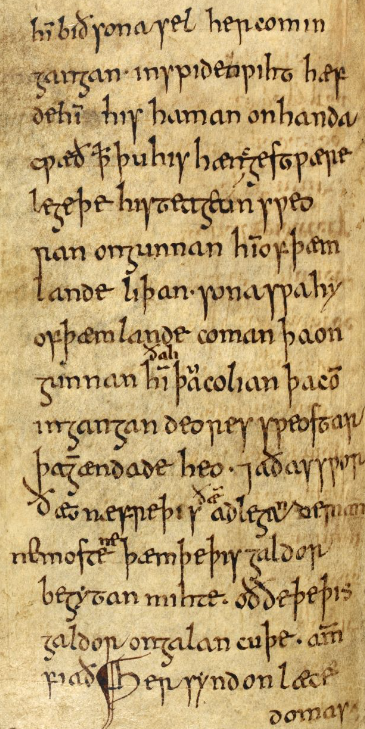
Second page of the XCIIIb charm, from the Lacnunga collection

Remedy XCIIIb is the most detailed of the Wið dweorh charms, consisting of writing the names of the Seven Sleepers of Ephesus on Communion wafers before reciting a galdor:

Wið dweorh: man sceal niman .VII. lytle oflætan swylce man mid ofrað ⁊ wri[t]an þas naman on ælcre oflætan: maximianus malchus. iohannes. Martinianus. dionisius. constantinus. serafion. þænne eft þæt galdor þæt [man] her æfter cweð[eð] man sceal singan, ærest on þæt wynstre eare, þænne on þæt swiðre eare, þænne [b]ufan þæs mannes moldan; ⁊ ga þænne an mædenman to ⁊ ho hit on his sweoran, ⁊ do man swa þry dagas. him bið sona sel.

Her com ingangan inspiden wiht.
Hæfde him his haman on handa; cwæð þæt þu his hæncgest wære.
Leg[d]e þe his teage [o]n sweoran; ongunnan him of þæm lande liþan.
Sona swa hy of þæm lande coman þa ongunnan him þa [leomu] colian.
Þa com ingangan deores sweostar.
Þa geændode heo ⁊ aðas swor
ðæt næfre þis ðæm adlegan [egl]ian ne moste
ne þæm þe þis galdor begytan mihte
oððe þe þis galdor ongalan cuðe.
Amen fia[t].

— Old English text
Translation:

Against dwarf: one must take seven small wafers such as are used for Communion, and write these names on each wafer: Maximianus, Malchus, Johannes, Martinianus, Dionysius, Constantinus, Seraphion. Then, next, the spell that is quoted hereafter is to be sung, first in the left ear then in the right ear, then above the man’s head; and then let a virgin approach and hang it on his neck, and let this been done in this way for three days. It will go better with him directly.

Here came to enter an inspiden creature.
He had his harness in his hand; said that you were his steed.
Laid his reins upon your neck; they began then to depart from the land.
As soon as they had come from the land then his [limbs] began to cool.
Then there came to enter the sister of the beast.
Then she made an end of it, and swore oaths,
that never should this thing [afflict] the patient,
or the one who was able to obtain this spell
or who knows how to chant this spell.
Amen, let it be'.

— Hines Translation

It has been noted that several components of this charm suggest that it was already old at the time of its recording, such as the use of the word "inspiden", whose meaning is unknown now, would have had no clear meaning even at the time of writing, and deores sweostar which is not metrical, since the first word should begin with an alliterating vowel.

== Interpretation and discussion ==
It has been argued that the Wið dweorh charms form part of a wider North Sea Germanic tradition that links dwarfs to the onset of sickness, also attested in the 8th century CE Ribe skull fragment and a lead plaque found near Fakenham in Norfolk dating to the 8th–11th century CE. In this cultural context, it has been argued that attempting to discriminate between the dwarf and the disease it is causing is not necessarily helpful, given that the banishing or killing of the harmful dwarf also is believed to lead to recovery from the sickness.

It has been proposed that the sickness in question is related to sleeping because of the inclusion of the Seven Sleepers in the charm. According to one source, "The names of the Seven Sleepers of Ephesus occur in various charms of the Middle Ages. They are usually, as might be expected, to secure sleep, but in some cases are to be employed against fever".

The conception of the dwarf in remedy XCIIIb has been proposed to link to the concept of a mare, a harmful being in Germanic folklore that is the root of the word "nightmare" and has been equated with the phenomenon of sleep paralysis. According to this theory, the dwarf in this charm is a manifestation of a night monster, as dwarfs were linked to the idea of harmful spirits and thought to be capable of causing physical harm. Similarity between the dwarf in XCIIIb and mares in medieval and later Germanic folklore is further seen in the conception of both beings riding their victims, causing symptoms such as injury, hallucinations and fevers.

== See also ==
- Apotropaic magic
- Canterbury charm
- Kvinneby amulet
- Sigtuna amulet I

== Bibliography ==
=== Secondary ===
- Hall, Alaric (2009). ""Þur sarriþu þursa trutin": Monster-Fighting and Medicine in Early Medieval Scandinavia". Asclepio. 61 (1): 195–218. doi:10.3989/asclepio.2009.v61.i1.278. PMID 19753693.
- Hines, John (2019). "Practical Runic Literacy in the Late Anglo-Saxon Period: Inscriptions on Lead Sheet". Anglo-Saxon Micro-Texts. Anglia Book Series. Vol. 67. pp. 29–59. doi:10.1515/9783110630961-003. ISBN 978-3-11-063096-1. S2CID 165389048.
- Lewis, Matthew C. G. (2005). Dreaming of Dwarves: Anglo-Saxon Dream Theory, Nightmares, and the Wið Dweorh Charm (PDF) (Thesis). University of Georgia. Archived from the original (PDF) on July 24, 2012.
- Nordström, Jackie (2021). "Dvärgen på Ribekraniet". Arkiv för Nordisk Filologi (in Swedish). 136: 5–24. doi:10.63420/anf.v136i.27870.
- Schmidt, Claire (2008). Sleeping Toward Christianity: The Form and Function of the Seven Sleepers Legend in Medieval British Oral Tradition (PDF) (Thesis). University of Missouri-Columbia.
