= Ribe healing-stick =

The Ribe healing stick (with Rundata signum DR EM85;493, also known as DK SJy41) is a pinewood stick found at Ribe, Denmark, with a heavily pagan-inspired Christian spell. It dates to circa 1300 CE.

== Description ==
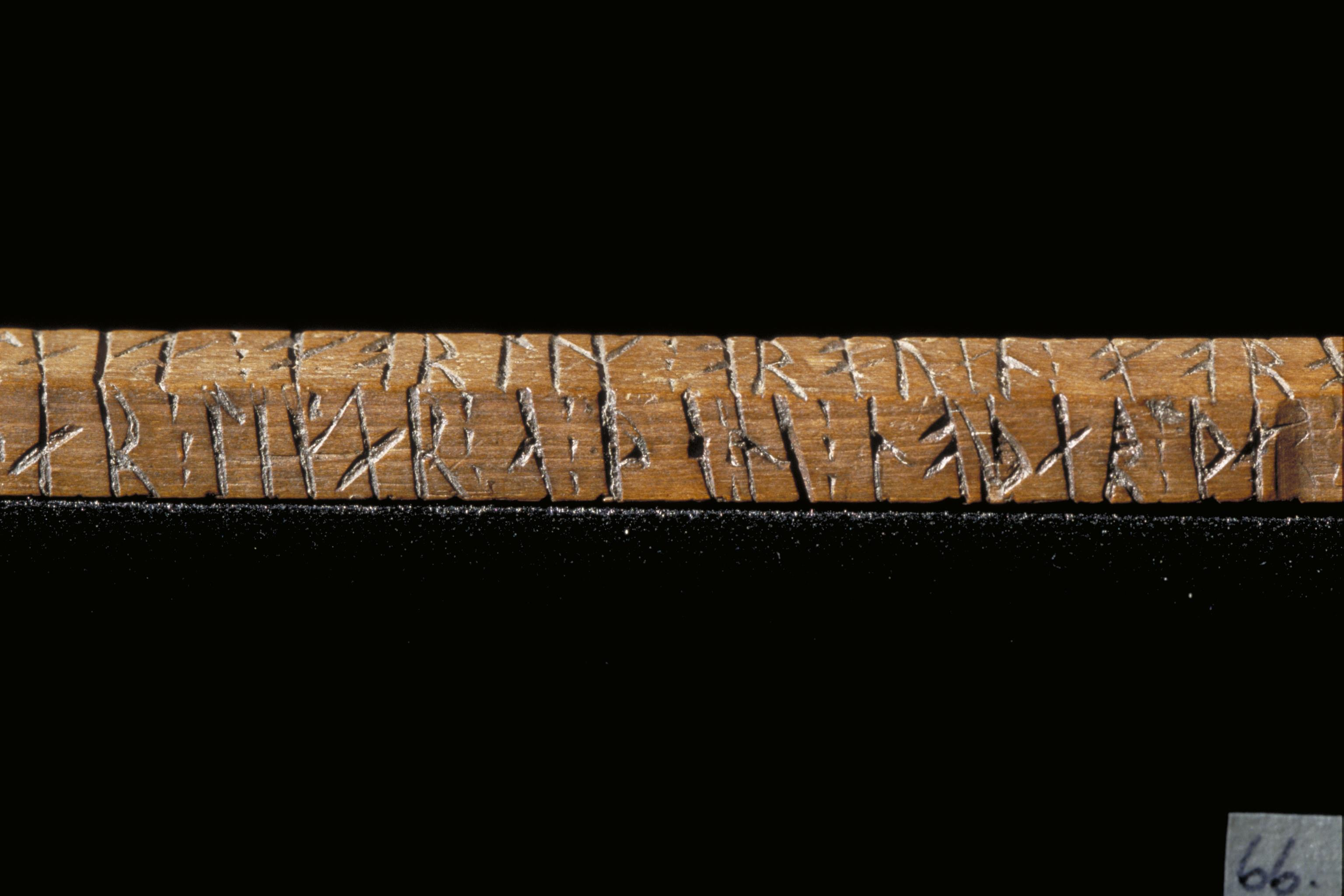
The section containing the phrase "nine needs" (ni : no=uþær).

Although ostensibly Christian, the charm written on the stick contains several native Germanic elements, such as alliteration and phrases also known from pagan poetry.

The phrase 'nine needs' (ni : no=uþær) appears in several explicitly pagan charms, such as the Swedish Sigtuna plate 1 and the Icelandic spell-book Galdrabók. The term læknæshand ("healing hand") is found in a pagan prayer in the Icelandic poem Sigrdrífumál, while the phrase "heavens above" or "high heaven" (uphimæn, literally "up-heaven") is used in Vǫluspá and in Old Saxon and Old English religious poetry as well as in the inscription on the Skarpåker Stone.

== Inscription ==
The stick has five sides. The final part of line C (after ¶r) has been scraped off with a knife, but faint traces of the runes are still visible. The following readings are from the Scandinavian Runic-text Database. Note that because the fifth side only contains the words þæt : se, it has been included in line D.

᛭ io=rþ : biþ a=k : ua=rþæ : o=k : uphimæn : so=l : o=k : sa=nt=æ maria : o=k : salfæn : gud| |drotæn : þæt han : læ mik : læknæs:ha=nd : o=k lif:tuggæ : at= =liuæ
{} Iorþ {} biþ ak {} uarþæ {} ok {} uphimæn, {} sol {} ok {} santæ Maria {} ok {} sialfæn {} Guþ drottin, {} þæt han {} læ mik {} læknæshand {} ok lif-tungæ {} at liuæ
I pray Earth to guard and High Heaven, the sun and Saint Mary and Lord God himself, that he grant me medicinal hands and healing tongue to heal

uiuindnæ : þær : botæ : þa=rf : or : ba=k : o=k or brʀst : or lækæ : o=k or lim : or øuæn : o=k or øræn : or : a=llæ þe : þær : ilt : kan i at
biuianda {} ær {} bota {} þarf {} or {} bak {} ok or bryst, {} or likæ {} ok or lim, {} or øwæn {} ok or øræn, {} or {} allæ þe {} þær {} ilt {} kan i at
the Trembler when a cure is needed. From back and from breast, from body and from limb, from eyes and from ears, from wherever evil can

kumæ : suart : hetær : sten : ha=n : stær : i : hafæ : utæ : þær : ligær : a : þe : ni : no=uþær : þæ¶r : l---r(a) : (þ)en-nþþæþeskulhuærki
kumæ. {} Svart {} hetær {} sten, {} han {} stær {} i {} hafæ {} utæ {} þær {} ligær {} a {} þe {} ni {} nouþær, {} þær {} … {} …
enter. A stone is called Svartr (black), it stands out in the sea, there lie upon it nine needs, who …

skulæ : huærki : søtæn : sofæ : æþ : uarmnæn : uakæ : førr æn : þu : þæssa : bot : biþær : þær : a=k o=rþ : at kæþæ : ro=nti : amæn : o=k : þæt : se ᛭
skulæ {} huærki {} søtæn {} sofæ {} æþ {} uarmæn {} uakæ {} førr æn {} þu {} þæssæ {} bot {} biþær, {} þær {} ak orþ {} at kæþæ {} ronti. {} Amen {} ok {} þæt {} se. {}
shall neither sleep sweetly nor wake warmly until you pray this cure which I have proclaimed in runic words. Amen and so be it.

== Gallery ==
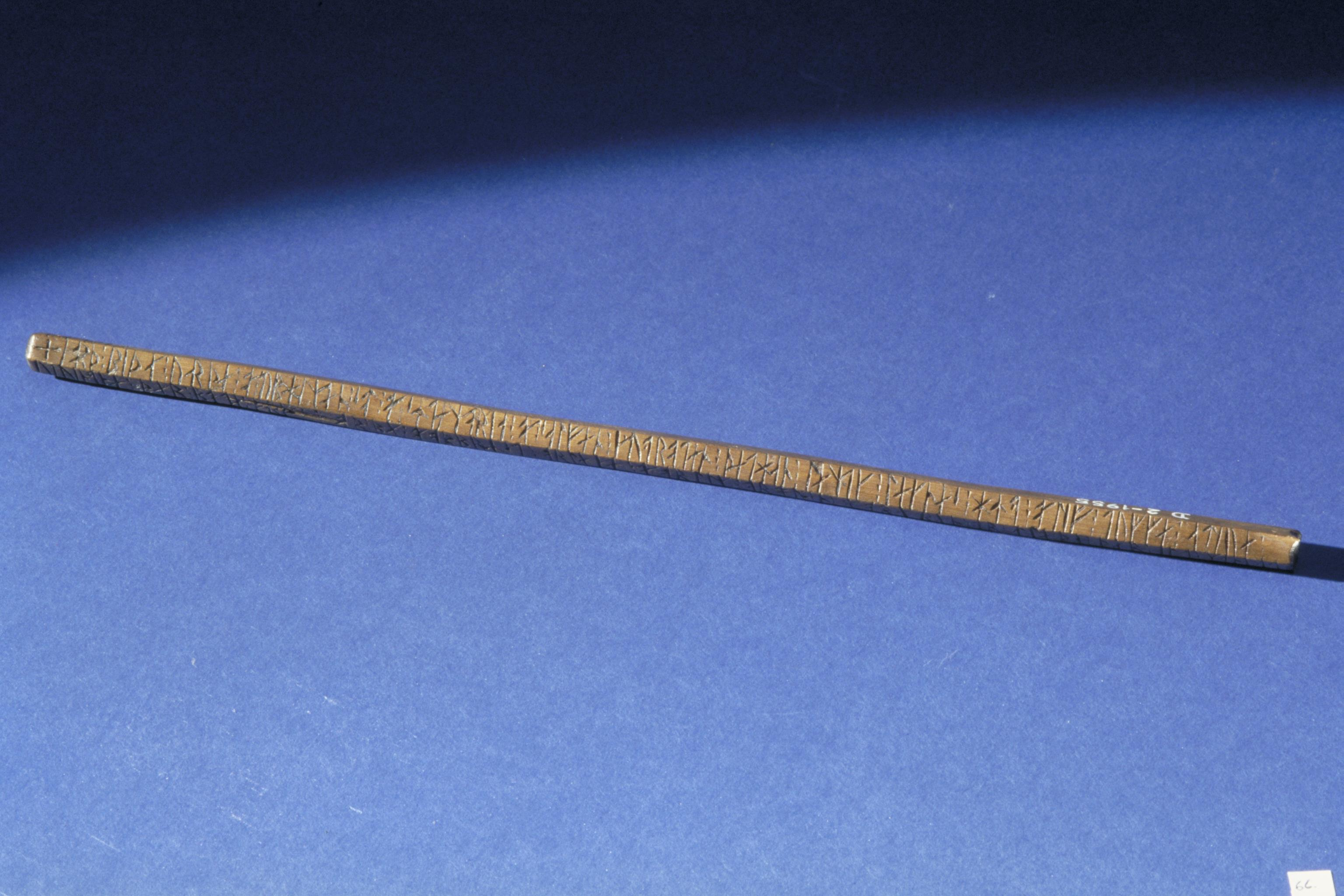
Side 1, starting with ᛭ io=rþ : biþ a=k.

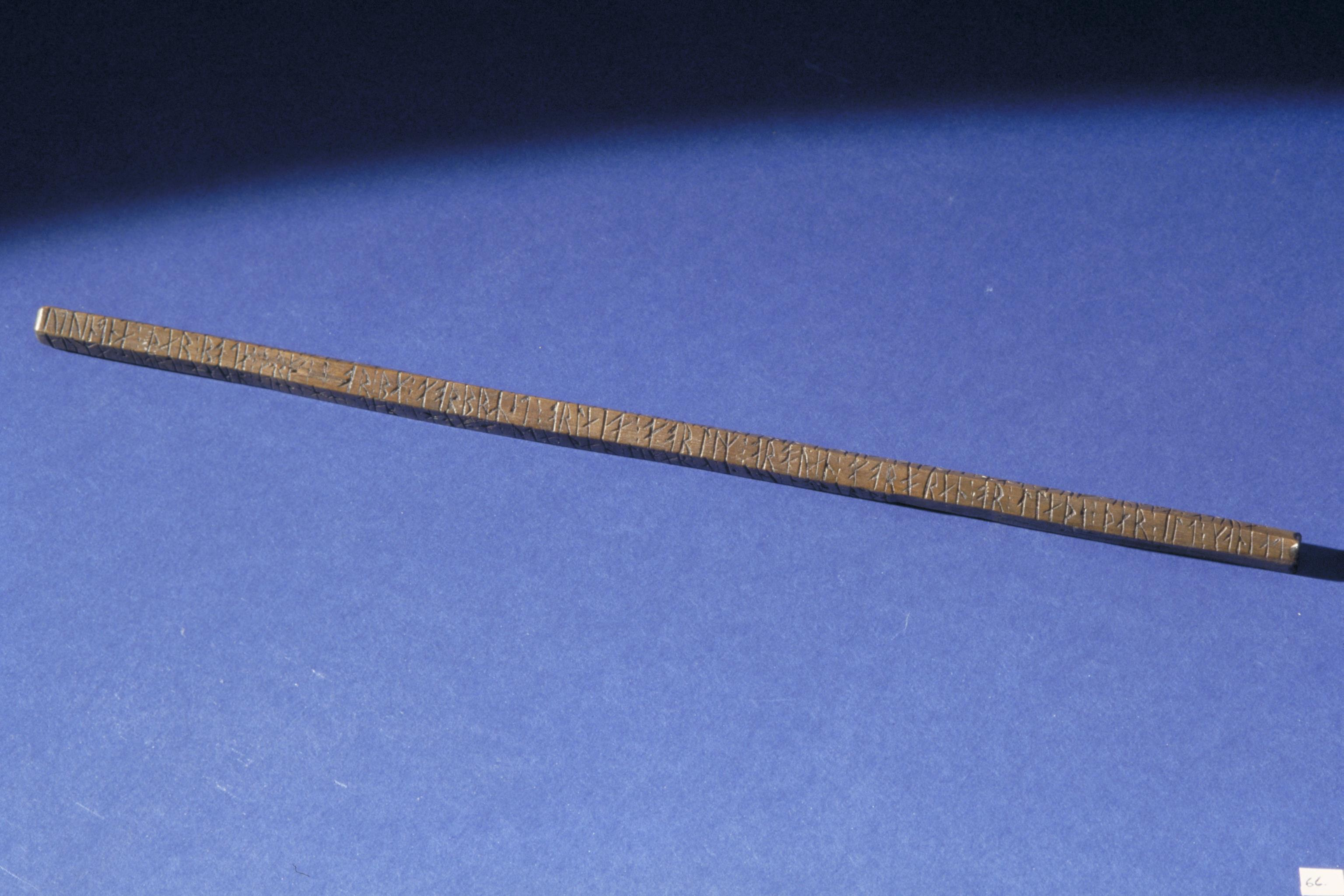
Side 2, starting with uiuindnæ : þær.

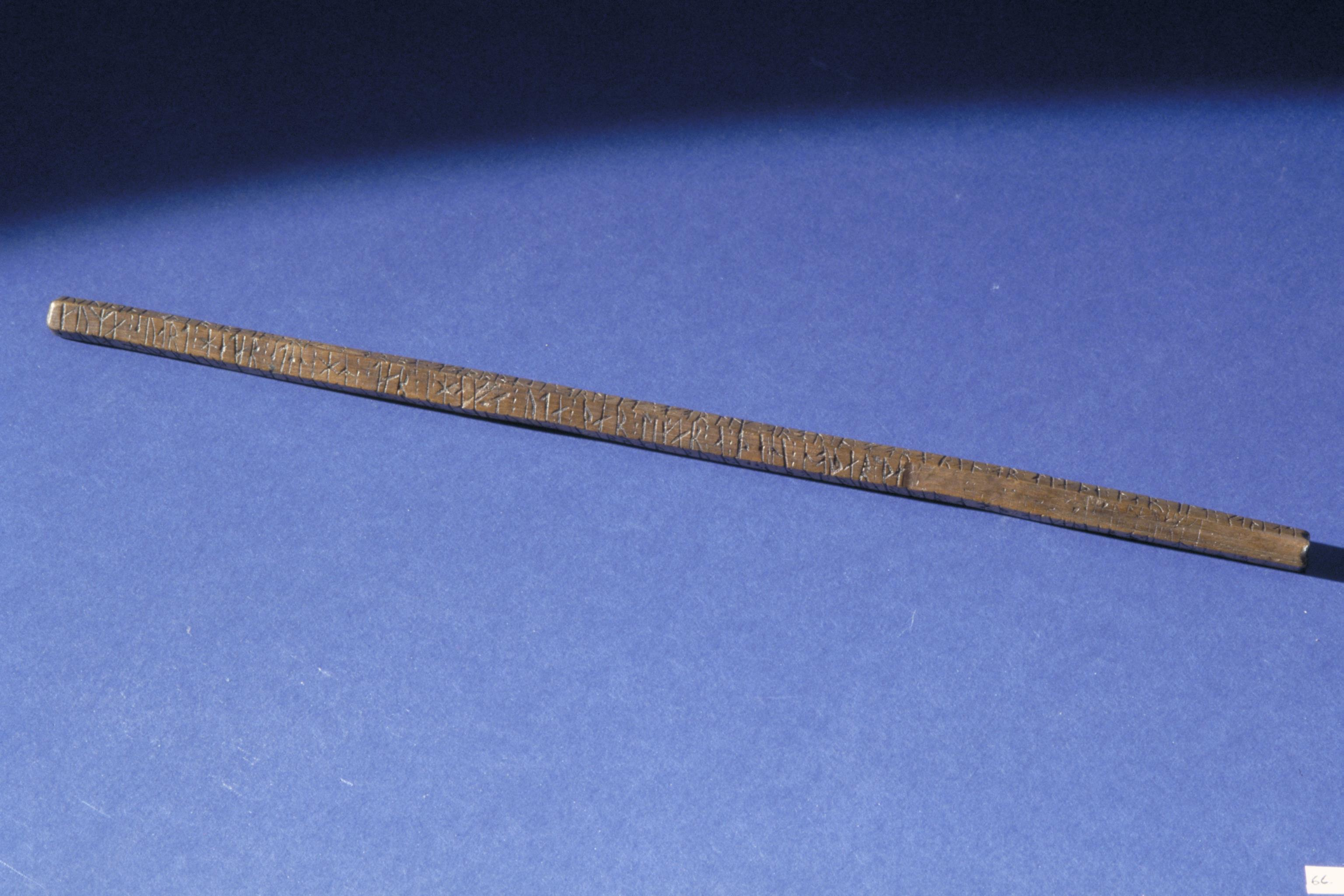
Side 3, starting with kumæ : suart.

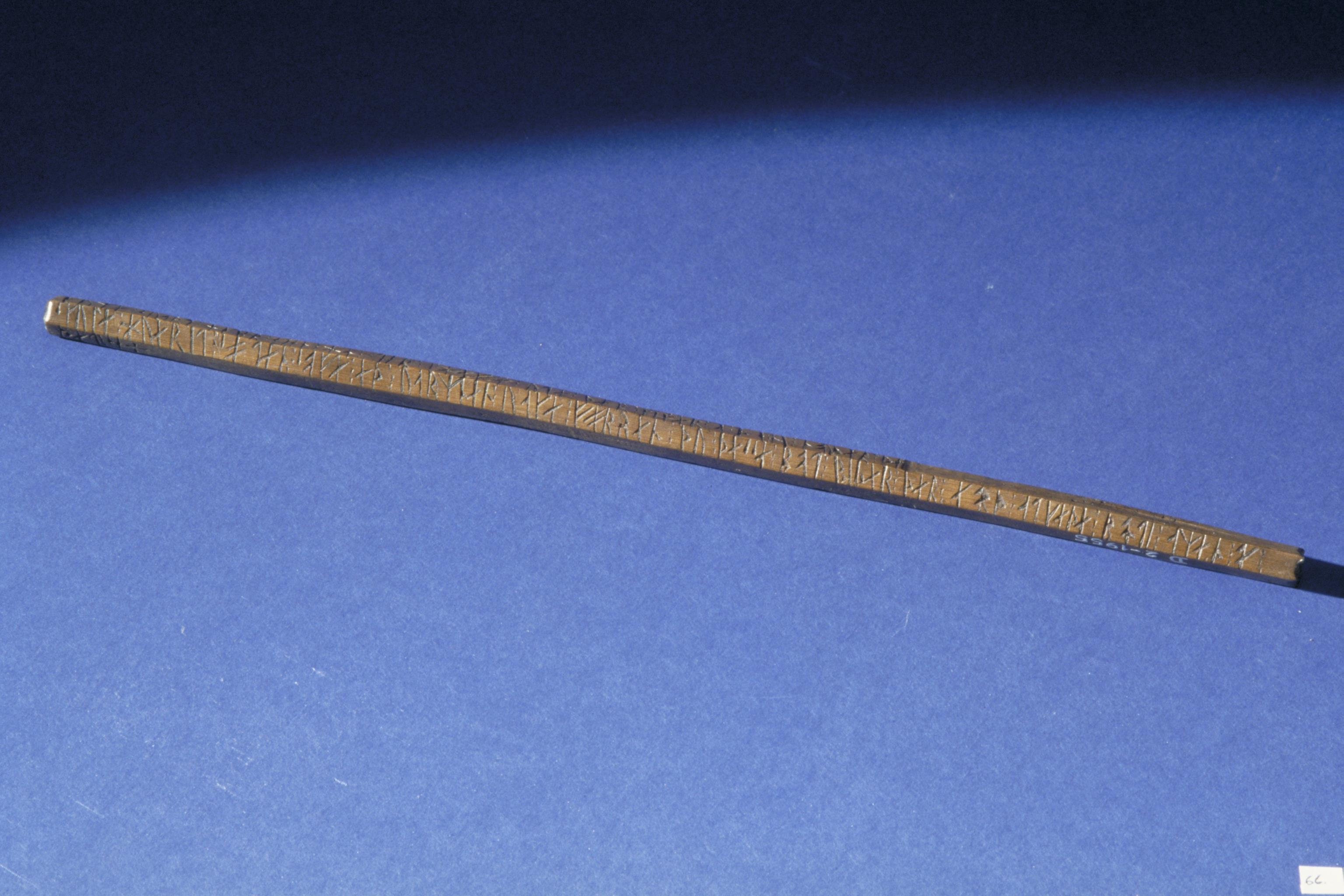
Side 4, starting with skulæ : huærki.

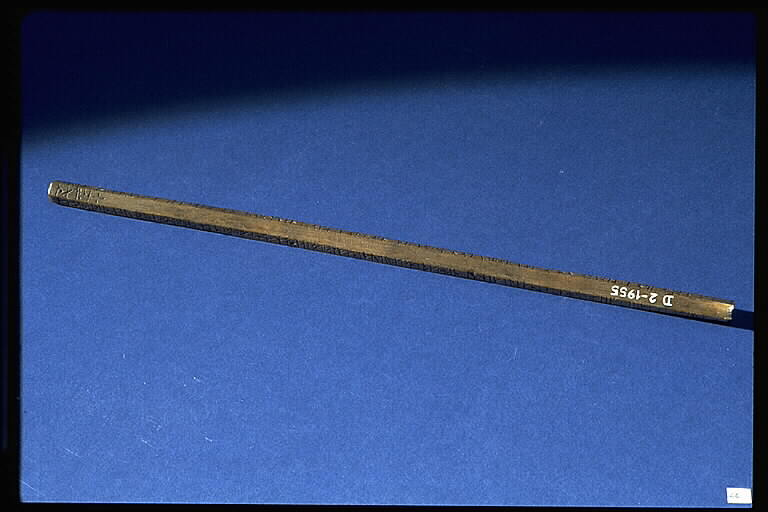
Side 5, þæt : se ᛭.

== See also ==
- Against a dwarf
- The 500-years older Ribe skull fragment.
