= Near Fakenham plaque =

Runic lead plaque

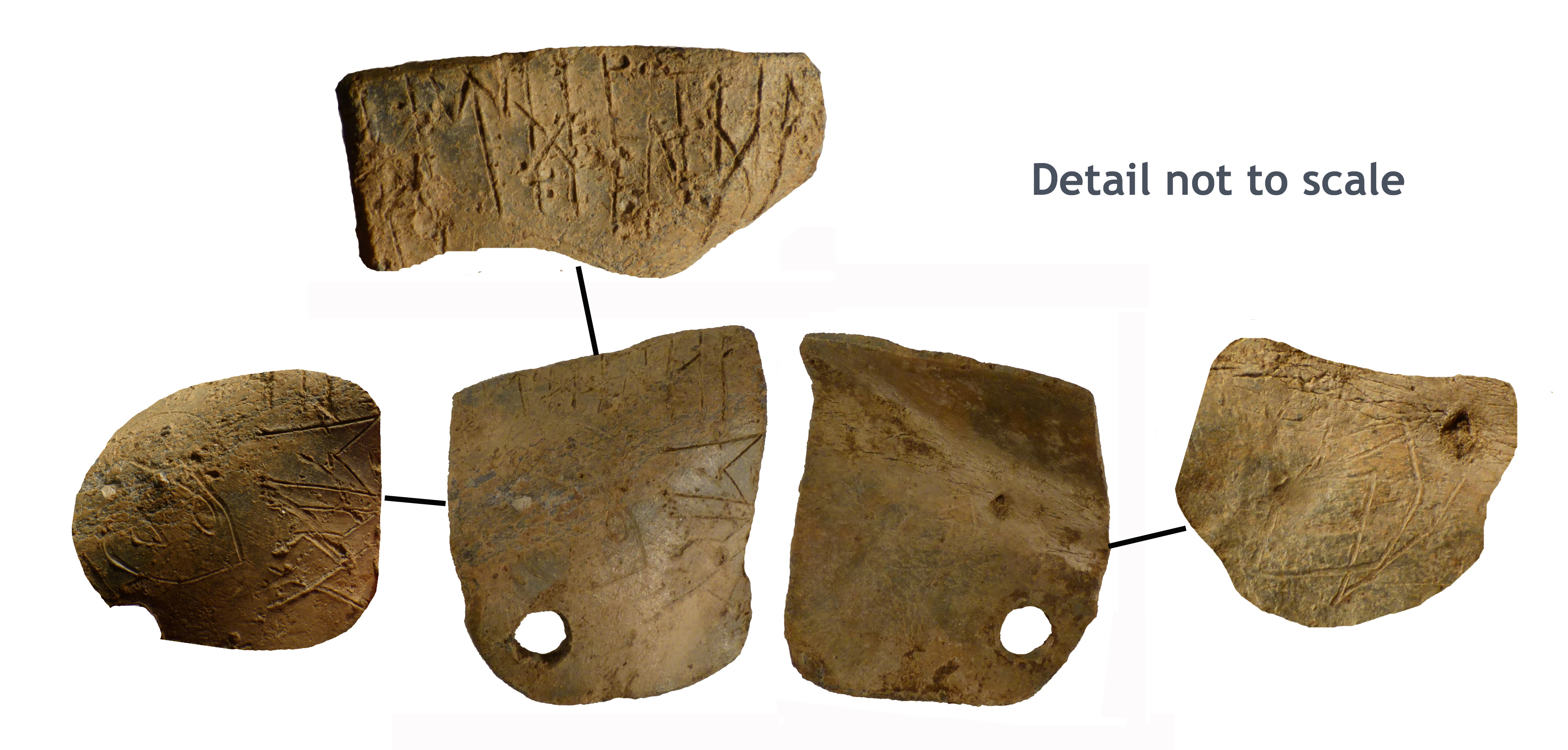
- Material: Lead
- Size: 29 × 24 × 1.2 mm
- Weight: 7.73 grams (0.273 oz)
- Writing: Anglo-Saxon runes
- Created: c. 750-1100 CE
- Discovered: 1 September 2015; Near Fakenham, United Kingdom
- Identification: NMS-63179C

The near Fakenham plaque is a lead plaque uncovered in Norfolk in England, dating to between the 8th and 11th centuries CE. It is notable for its Old English runic inscription that has led to the widely accepted interpretation of the item as having been used for healing an affliction either caused by, or conceived of, as a dwarf.

== Discovery and dating ==
The plaque was found in 2015 during metal-detecting in a field adjacent to a church and near Fakenham in western Norfolk, though the precise location is currently not disclosed. Though the plaque itself has not been able to be directly dated, it is generally dated to between the later half of the 8th century CE to the 11th century CE, based on other findings from the same field. This broad window is consistent with the linguistic evidence from the inscription.

== Physical description and inscriptions ==
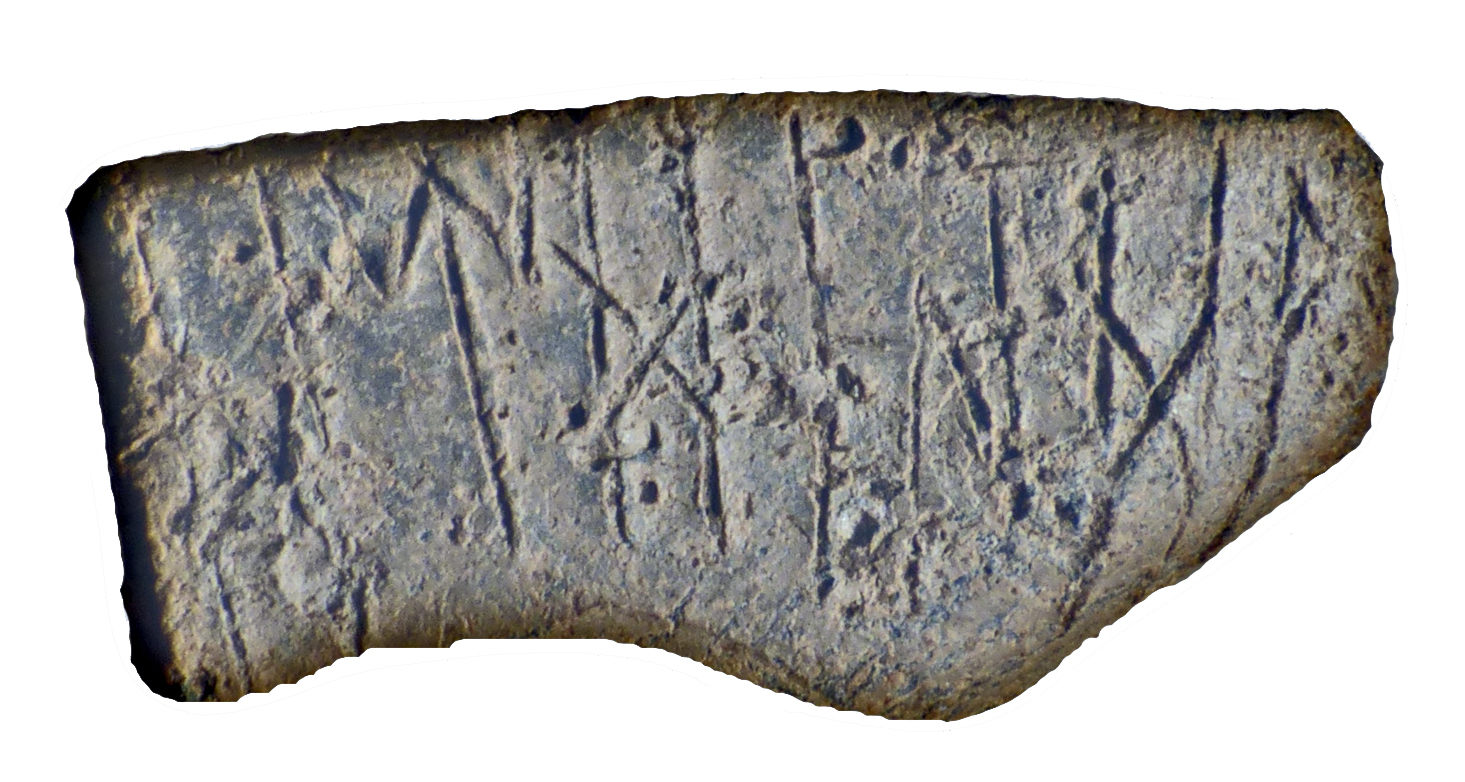
Detail of the runic inscription of the plaque.

The plaque is made of lead, weighing approximately 8 g and measuring approximately 3 cm along its longest side. One face has a single nail hole and bears a carving that has been noted to resemble a human-like mask with a pair of pointed eyes.

Along the sides are carving Anglo-Saxon runes that spell out the Old English phrase 'deadisdwerg', meaning 'dead is dwarf'. The last three runes are carved on a separate side to the others and the first ᛞ or Dæg rune is partially obscured; nevertheless, both this reading of the runes and their translation are widely accepted. The 'ea' diphthong is represented by a single ᛠ or Ear rune, a late Anglo-Saxon rune, with the oldest datable example coming from the middle of the 8th-century CE.

== Interpretation and discussion ==
It is generally accepted that the plaque was used as part of a healing process, in which by the writing and displaying of the text, the dwarf either causing, or equated to, the illness died, and could thus no longer harm the afflicted person. The item has been argued to form part of a wider North Sea Germanic tradition that links dwarfs to the onset of sickness, also attested in the 8th century CE Ribe skull fragment and the Wið dweorh charms found in the Lacnunga. In this cultural context, it has been argued that attempting to discriminate between the dwarf and the disease it is causing is not necessarily helpful, given that the banishing or killing of the harmful dwarf is believed to equate to the elimination of the sickness.

== See also ==
- Apotropaic magic
- Canterbury charm
- Kvinneby amulet
- Sigtuna amulet I

== Bibliography ==
=== Secondary ===
- Hall, Alaric (2009). ""Þur sarriþu þursa trutin": Monster-Fighting and Medicine in Early Medieval Scandinavia". Asclepio. 61 (1): 195–218. doi:10.3989/asclepio.2009.v61.i1.278. PMID 19753693.
- Hines, John (2019). "Anglo-Saxon Micro-Texts - Practical Runic Literacy in the Late Anglo-Saxon Period: Inscriptions on Lead Sheet". Anglia Book Series. 63 (1): 29–59. doi:10.1515/9783110630961-003. S2CID 165389048.
- Nordström, Jackie (2021). "Dvärgen på Ribekraniet". Arkiv för Nordisk Filologi (in Swedish). 136: 5–24.
- "Record ID: NMS-63179C - EARLY MEDIEVAL inscribed object". The Portable Antiquities Scheme.
