= Wight =

Being, thing, or spirit

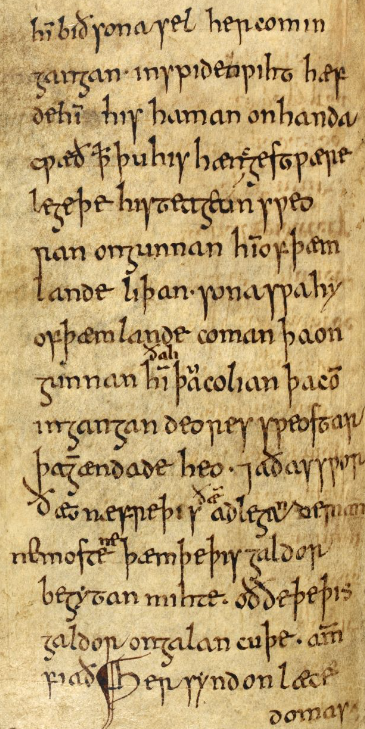
Page recording a charm against a dwarf, from the Lacnunga collection, in which the dwarf is referred to as a wiht.

A wight is a being or thing. This general meaning of the term is shared by its cognates in other Germanic languages, but their usages vary greatly over time and between regions. In Old English, it could refer to anything in existence, with more specificity arising in Middle English, perhaps due to the term of similar meaning in Anglo-Norman, creature. In modern fantasy, wights are often specifically undead.

== Etymology ==
Modern English "wight" is descended from Middle English: wight or Middle English: wiȝt, from Old English: wiht, from Proto-West Germanic '*wihti' from Proto-Germanic: *wihtiz from Proto-Indo-European: '*wekti' ("cause, sake, thing"), from Proto-Indo-European "*wekʷ-" ("to say, tell"). "Wight" is further cognate with Scots: wicht, German: Wicht, Dutch: Wicht, Gothic: 𐍅𐌰𐌹𐌷𐍄𐍃 and Old Norse: vættr, the ancestor of Swedish: vätte, Danish: vætte and Icelandic: vættur. A dialect form in Swedish is vätter, which, similar to the other form, is descended from Old Swedish: vætter.

== Medieval period ==
=== Old English ===
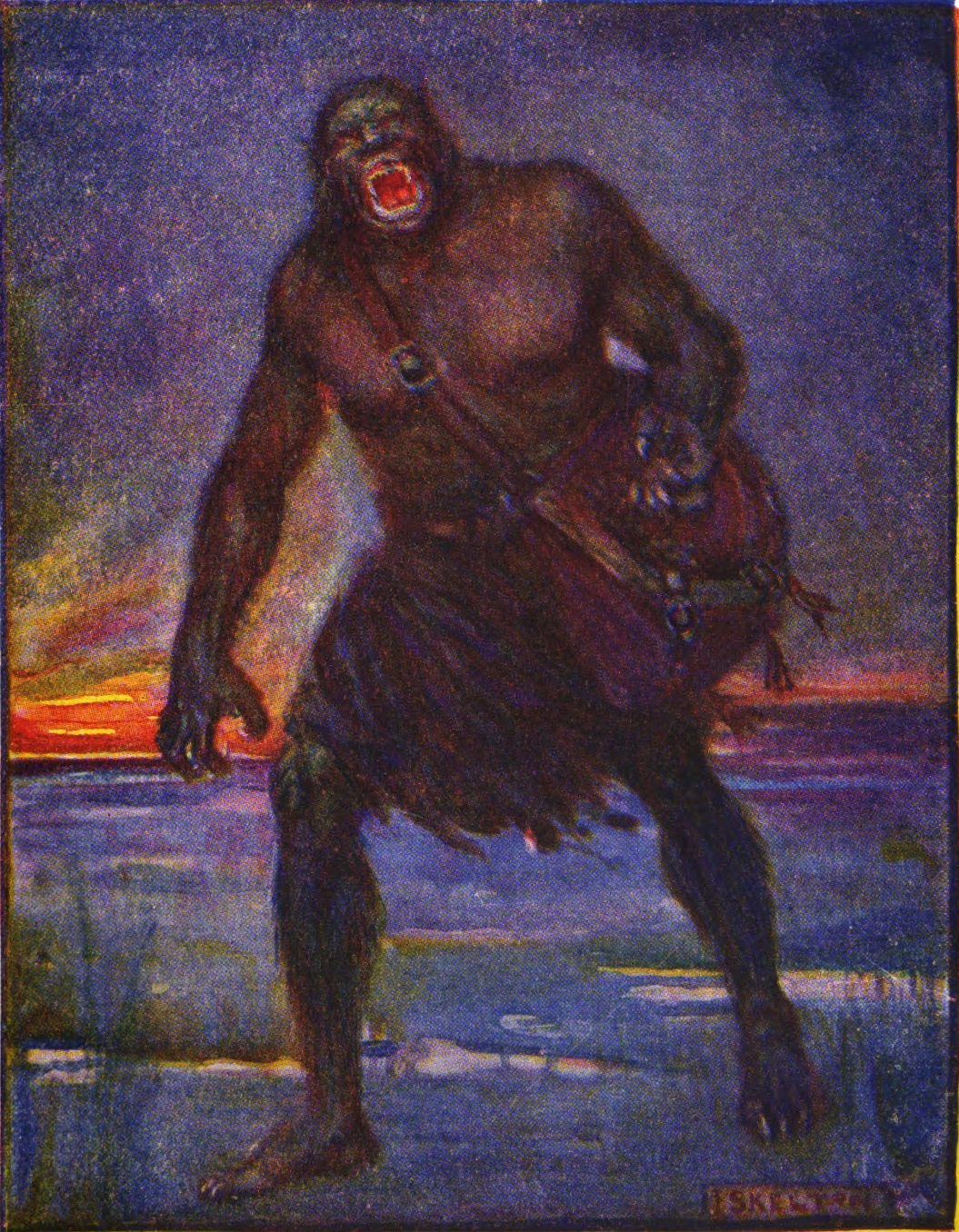
The eoten Grendel, who is described in Beowulf as wiht unhaélo ("that damned creature"), as illustrated by J. R. Skelton.

In Old English, wiht has been variously translated as "wight", "creature" and "being". The term is found in the compound words eall-wihta ("all beings") and á-wiht ("aught", "anything"). Wiht is often used as the subject of riddles, such as riddle 86 from the Exeter Book, in which it has been interpreted as referring to a person selling vegetables, likely garlics. The term is also used to refer to beings such as the dwarf which is the focus of the XCIIIB charm, and the eoten Grendel and the dragon in Beowulf.

The word began to acquire the sense of supernatural or unearthly beings, included in the 8th century Lindisfarne Gospels.

=== Middle English ===
==== Connotations and scope ====
When creature was borrowed from Anglo-Norman around 1300 CE, it was possibly wholly synonymous with Middle English: wight, however over time the words became differentiated by speakers. The exact usage of the term varies between works but it broadly is used in one of five loose categories that blur between themselves:

- a "living creature", an element of the earthly world
- a generic being, with few connotations
- an enemy or social inferior that is seen as other
- as beloved, often gendered
- a being connected to the spiritual realm, either good or bad

The term is used to refer to a range of positive beings with supernatural aspects such as saints, Jesus, and his mother, Mary. It has been argued that the term could be used for anything other than God the Father, as he himself was not created in Christian theology. It has been noted, however, that it is stated in the Man of Law that Daniel in the lion's den was saved by "No wight but God", showing it was possible to use the term to refer to a class of beings that includes both man and the Christian god. Though there are no extant texts in Middle English that refer to God the Father directly as a wight.

The most common use of the term, however, is to refer to everyday corporeal beings as these are much more represented in normal conversation. Wight is commonly found with adjectives, such as curside, wikkede, or worldly. The phrase "sweet wight" is notable, occurring frequently and often in gendered and romantic contexts.

==== Examples ====
- Geoffrey Chaucer

The Reeve's Tale, (1387–1400), line 4236:

"For [Aleyn] had swonken al the longe nyght,
And seyde, 'Fare weel, Malyne, sweete wight!'"

The Monk's Tale, (1387–1400), line 380:

"She kept her maidenhood from every wight
To no man deigned she for to be bond."

The Book of the Duchess, (1387–1400), line 579:

"Worste of alle wightes."

Prologue of The Knight, (1387–1400), line 72–73:

"Ne neuere yet no vileynye he sayde
In al his lyf vnto no manere wight.
He was a verray parfit gentil knyght."

The House of Fame, (1379–1380), line 1830–1831:

"We ben shrewes, every wight,
And han delyt in wikkednes."

=== Old Norse ===
As with "wight", Old Norse: vættr (pl. vættir) means a being, especially a supernatural being. It occurs in compound nouns such as mein-vættr ("evil wight"), land-vættr ("guardian spirit of a country"), vitta vettr ("witch wight" or "sorceress") and bjargvættr ("helping sprite").

== Modern period ==
=== Modern English ===
==== Modern Fantasy ====
Wights feature in J. R. R. Tolkien's world of Middle-earth, especially in The Lord of the Rings, and in George R. R. Martin's novel series A Song of Ice and Fire. Since its 1974 inclusion in the RPG Dungeons & Dragons (D&D), it has become a recurring form of undead in other fantasy games and mods, such as Vampire: The Masquerade. Wights feature in Swedish author Astrid Lindgren's book (and subsequent film) Ronja, the Robber's Daughter. They are always female, with wings and a polly beak. Their aim is to catch the protagonist Ronja when she is alone and kidnap her.

==== Examples of usage ====
- Edmund Spenser, The Faerie Queene, (1590–1596), I.i.6.8–9:
  "That every wight to shrowd it did constrain,
  And this fair couple eke to shroud themselues were fain."
- William Shakespeare, The Merry Wives of Windsor, (c. 1602), Act I, Sc. III:
  "O base Hungarian wight! wilt thou the spigot wield?"
- William Shakespeare, Othello, (c. 1603), Act II, Sc. I:
  "She was a wight, if ever such wight were"
- John Milton, On the Death of a Fair Infant Dying of a Cough, (1626), verse vi:
  "Oh say me true if thou wert mortal 'wight..."
- Church of Scotland, Scots Metrical Psalter, (1650), Psalm 18 verse xxvi:
  "froward thou kythst unto the froward wight..."
- William Wordsworth, "To the Daisy" (1802) line 28:
  Whole Summer-fields are thine by right;
  And Autumn, melancholy wight!
  Doth in thy crimson head delight
  When rains are on thee.
- John Keats, "La Belle Dame Sans Merci", (1820):
  Ah what can ail thee, wretched wight,
  Alone and palely loitering;
- Washington Irving, "The Legend of Sleepy Hollow" (1820):
  "In this by-place of nature there abode, in a remote period of American history, that is to say, some thirty years since, a worthy wight of the name of Ichabod Crane, who sojourned, or, as he expressed it, "tarried," in Sleepy Hollow, for the purpose of instructing the children of the vicinity."
- George Gordon, Lord Byron (1812–1816), Childe Harold's Pilgrimage Canto 1, verse :
  Ah, me! in sooth he was a shamles wight ...".
- Edwin Greenslade Murphy, "Wot Won the Larst?", in Dryblower’s Verses, (1926):
  From weedy little wights whose cigarettes
  Recall a badly-disinfected drain
- W.S. Gilbert, "Princess Ida", (1883), a song sung by the character King Gama:
  "Now when a wight sits up all night, ill natured jokes devising,
  and all his wiles are met with smiles, it's hard, there's no disguising!"

=== German ===
A similar change of meaning can be seen in the German cognate Wicht, meaning a living human being, generally rather small, poor or miserable man (not woman). The word is somewhat old-fashioned in today's language, but it is still used and readily recognized in everyday speech.

The diminutive Wichtel refers to beings in folklore and fantasy, generally small, and often helpful, dwelling in or near human settlements, secretly doing work and helping the humans, somewhat similar to the more specific Heinzelmännchen. Wichtel in this sense is recorded since the Middle Ages. Today, Wichtel is more often used than Wicht.

=== Dutch ===
The word wicht can be used to refer, to any woman, often with negative connotations. It is not used to refer to men.

Booswicht (literally evil-being) matching 'villain', can be used to describe both men and women.

=== North Germanic languages ===
In Danish, the term vætte and the Norwegian cognate vette typically refer to supernatural beings from folklore or a lesser god, especially those that live underground or near the home, such as dwarfs and nisser. In Swedish, vätte similarly typically refers to supernatural beings, often those that are small and resembling humans.

== See also ==
- Rå, spirits that protect natural features in Scandinavian folklore
- Landvættir, beings associated with the land in Scandinavia
- Kami, gods and spirits in Japanese mythology
- Nymph, minor nature goddesses in Greek legends
- Fairy, magical beings of world folklore
- Kamuy, nature deities of the Ainu peoples

== Bibliography ==
=== Primary ===
- Martin. "Chapter 52: Jon". A Game of Thrones.
- Slade, Benjamin. "Beowulf". heorot.dk.

=== Secondary ===
- Farrell, Thomas J. (2015). "The Meanings of Middle English Wight". The Chaucer Review. 50 (1–2): 178–197. doi:10.5325/chaucerrev.50.1-2.0178. ISSN 0009-2002. JSTOR 10.5325/chaucerrev.50.1-2.0178.
- Hines, John (2019). "Anglo-Saxon Micro-Texts - Practical Runic Literacy in the Late Anglo-Saxon Period: Inscriptions on Lead Sheet". Anglia Book Series. 63 (1): 29–59. doi:10.1515/9783110630961-003. S2CID 165389048.
- Wilcox, Jonathan (1996). "Mock-Riddles in Old English: Exeter Riddles 86 and 19". Studies in Philology. 93 (2): 180–187. ISSN 0039-3738. JSTOR 4174544.
- Sins of the blood. McCoy, Angel., White Wolf Publishing. Clarkston, GA: White Wolf Pub. 2001. pp. 9, 17–24. ISBN 158846217X. OCLC 62150117.
- Tichy, Martin Rocek, Ondrej. "wiht". Bosworth-Toller's Anglo-Saxon Dictionary online.
- Tichy, Martin Rocek, Ondrej. "eall-wihta". Bosworth-Toller's Anglo-Saxon Dictionary online.
- Tichy, Martin Rocek, Ondrej. "wiht". Bosworth-Toller's Anglo-Saxon Dictionary online.
- "Old Icelandic Dictionary - Bjargvættr". Old Icelandic Dictionary.
- "Old Icelandic Dictionary - Landvættr". Old Icelandic Dictionary.
- "Old Norse Dictionary - Vættr". Cleasby & Vigfusson - Old Norse Dictionary.
- "wight". Wiktionary, the free dictionary. 6 September 2023.
- "Reconstruction:Proto-Germanic/wihtiz". Wiktionary, the free dictionary. 9 April 2023.
- "vätte | SAOB". SAOB (in Swedish).
- "vætte". Det Danske Sprog- og Litteraturselskab.
- "vette". Store norske leksikon.
- Kvideland, Reimund; Sehmsdorf, Hemming K. (2010). Scandinavian folk belief and legend (10. print ed.). Minneapolis: Univ. of Minnesota Press. ISBN 978-0816619672.
- Reidar Th. Christiansen (1964) Folktales of Norway (University of Chicago Press) ISBN 978-0226105109
- “Norske Folkeeventyr.” Encyclopædia Britannica, Encyclopædia Britannica, inc., www.britannica.com/topic/Norske-folkeeventyr.
