= Ribe skull fragment =

Skull fragment inscribed with runes

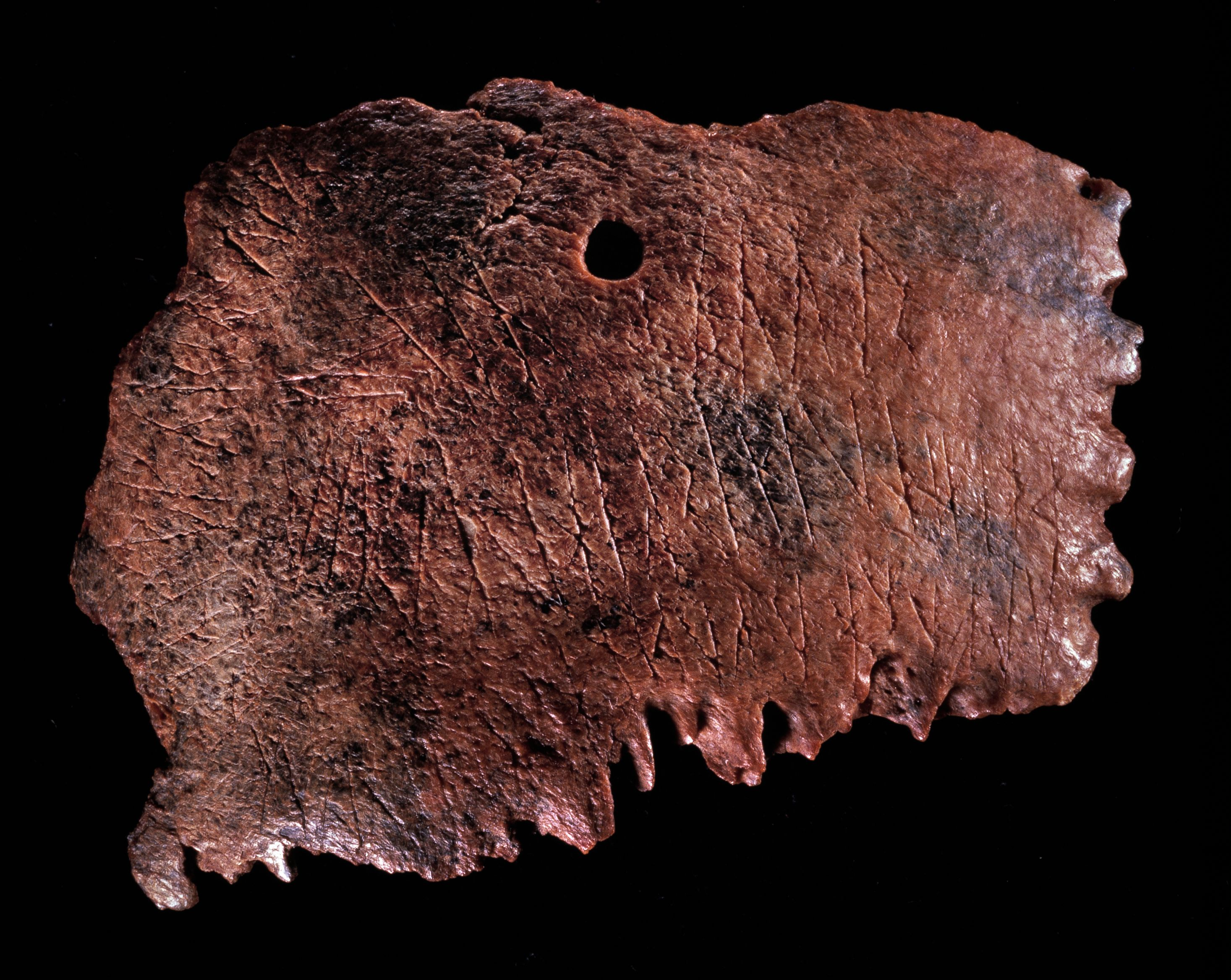
Photograph of the fragment, showing bored hole and inscription.

The Ribe skull fragment (DR EM85;151B in Rundata, also known as DK SJy39) is a section of human skull bone inscribed with runes and unearthed in 1973 in an archaeological excavation at Ribe, Denmark. It dates to circa 725 CE.

== Description ==
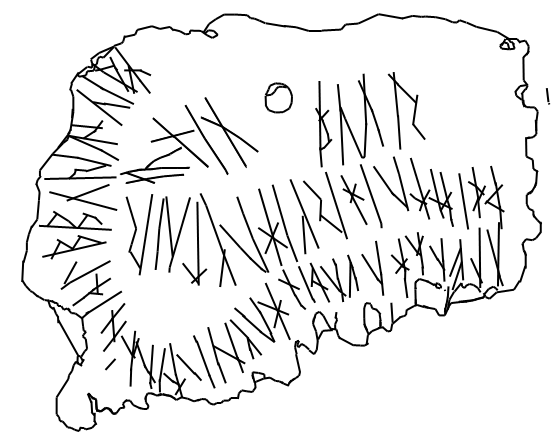
Drawing of the fragment, highlighting the runic inscription.

The skull fragment is approximately 6 x 8.5 cm in size and has been taken from the top of a cranium. It has a hole bored in it and it is inscribed with transitional Younger Futhark runes. The runic inscription retains two character shapes from the Elder Futhark, ᚺ (H) and ᛗ (M). The object was last studied through a digital microscope in 2021 and was found to contain the following runes:

ᚢᛚᚠᚢᛦᛡᚢᚴᚢᚦᛁᚾᛡᚢᚴᚺᚢᛏᛁᚢᛦ ¶ ᚺᛁᛡᛚᛒᛒᚢᚱᛁᚾᛋᚢᛁᚦᛦ ¶ ᚦᛡᛁᛗᛏᚢᛁᛡᚱᚴᛁᛡᚢᚴᛏᚢᛁᚱᚴᚢᚾᛁᚢ ¶ ᛒᚢᚢᚱ
ulfuʀᴀukuþinᴀukʜutiuʀ ¶ ʜiᴀlbburinsuiþʀ ¶ þᴀiᴍtuiᴀrkiᴀuktuirkuniu ¶ buur

== Interpretation ==
A possible interpretation of the inscription is:

Ulfʀ auk Ōðinn auk Hō-Tīwʀ. Hiālp burin's/burins/Burins viðʀ þæim dværgi auk dværgyniu Bōur.
Ulfʀ and Ōðinn and High-Tīwʀ. The help is borne/the newborns/Burins help against that dwarf and the dwarfess Bōur.

Where "Ulfʀ" refers to some unknown deity, "Ōðinn" to the god Odin, and "High-Tīwʀ" to the god Týr. The word "hiālp" and the hole at the top make the object similar to other protective amulets such as that of Kvinneby (Öl SAS1989;43). The next sequence of runes ᛒᚢᚱᛁᚾᛋ could either mean burin [e]s 'is borne', which would tie up with the hole, burins 'the newborns', which would indicate that the object is a protective amulet for a newborn, or Burins 'Burins', the name of the person who was protected by the amulet. The phrase viðʀ þæim dværgi auk dværgyniu Bōur names two beings that the amulet protects the bearer from, a dwarf, which possibly has the name as the bearer (i.e., Burinn), and a dwarfess Bōur.

The object has a striking similarity to the Near Fakenham plaque, which is also a protective runic amulet against a dwarf, and more generally to the Anglo-Saxon charms Against a Dwarf, one of which even contains a male and a female dwarf (Wið Dweorh XCIIIb). Together with these inscriptions, the Ribe Skull fragment seems to have been part of a common North Sea belief that dwarfs could cause illnesses and that protective amulets could be worn to fend these off.

It has been pointed that there is a general lack of wear in the hole of the type that would be expected if it had been worn using a cord as a protective amulet. On the other hand, the fragment was found among remains from a market place, so it might never have been sold and used.

== Previous readings and interpretations ==
Rune 31 has previously been read as a possible i and the sequence HiAlbburiis as Hiālp buri is 'help is through the drill' or Hiālp Būri is 'Būri is help'. However, Nordström (2021), who studied the object in a digital microscope, found that the rune must be read as an n. Moreover, rune 41 was previously read as an A and the sequence uiþʀ ¶ þAiMAuiArki as viðʀ þæima værki 'against this pain'. Here, Nordström found that the twigs crossed the main stave too high up to be read as an A. Lastly, rune 59 was read as an n by Stocklund (1996) and the sequence Auktuirkunin as auk dværg[ʀ] unninn 'and the dwarf overcome'. However, most scholars have read it as a u and Nordström (2021) found that the twig again crossed the main stave too high up to be read as an n. Furthermore, the interpretation auk dværg unninn is linguistically highly unlikely, since the nominative subject dværg[ʀ] lacks the palatal ʀ, which was obligatory by 700 and present on the other nominative masculine nouns (Ulfʀ and Tīwʀ). Furthermore, the interpretation offered by Nordström viðʀ þæim dværgi auk dværgyniu is also more plausible since it represents an alliterating masculine-feminine pair like æsir ok ásynjur. The word dværgynia, firstly proposed by Grønvik (1999), is also attested in a later West-Norse form dyrgja.

== See also ==
- Canterbury charm
- Kvinneby amulet
- Ribe healing-stick
- Saltfleetby spindle-whorl
- Sigtuna amulet I
