= Canterbury charm =

Old Norse runic charm from 1073

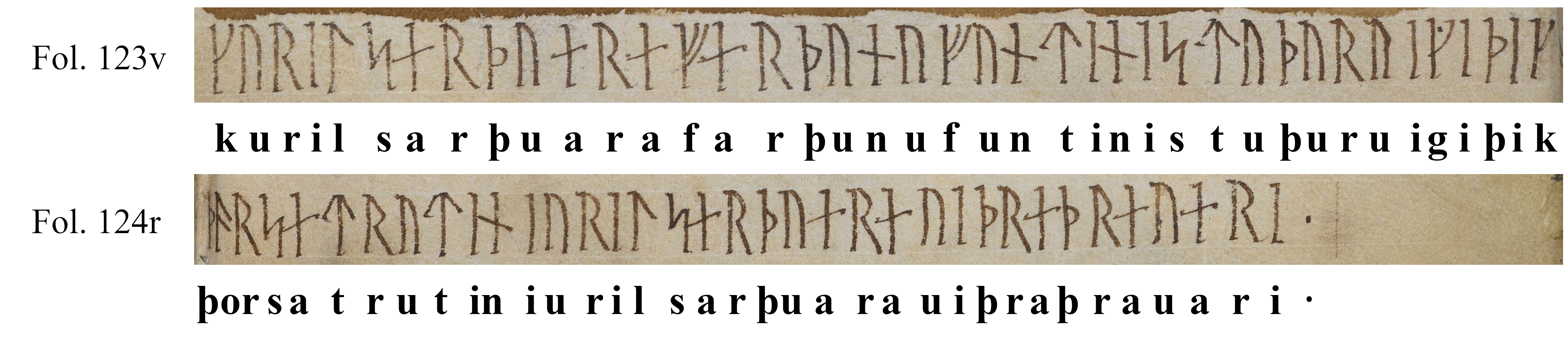
The original runes, with Latin transliteration

The Canterbury charm is an Old Norse runic charm inserted in the lower margin of an Anglo-Saxon manuscript (London, British Library, Cotton Caligula A.xv, folios 123v to 124r) from the year 1073.

== Inscription ==
The runes are clear, and the transliteration of the runes is straight-forward (spaces between words not present in the original):

kuril sarþuara far þu nu funtin is tu þur uigi þik ¶ þorsa trutin iuril sarþuara uiþr {aþra uari}
Gyrils sārþvara far þū nū! Fundinn eʀ þū! Þōrr vīgi þik, {} þursa drōttinn, Gyrils sārþvara. Viðr aðravari.
Gyrill's wound-tap, you go now! You are found! May Thor hallow you, lord of the trolls. Gyrill's wound-tap. Against pus in the veins (blood poisoning).

Similarly, the charm is translated by Macleod and Mees (2006) as:

Gyril wound-causer, go now! You are found. May Thor bless you, lord of ogres! Gyril wound-causer. Against blood-vessel pus!

== Interpretation ==
The charm is intended for use against a specific ailment, described as "blood-vessel pus." MacLeod and Mees note that while Thor is not revered in surviving sources for his medical abilities, he was well attested as harboring enmity towards giants and as a protector of mankind. MacLeod and Mees compare the charm to the 11th-century Kvinneby amulet (where Thor is also called upon to provide protection), the formula structure of the Sigtuna amulet I, and the inscription on a then-recently discovered rib bone also from Sigtuna, Sweden.
