= Sigtuna amulet I =

11th century artifact from Sweden

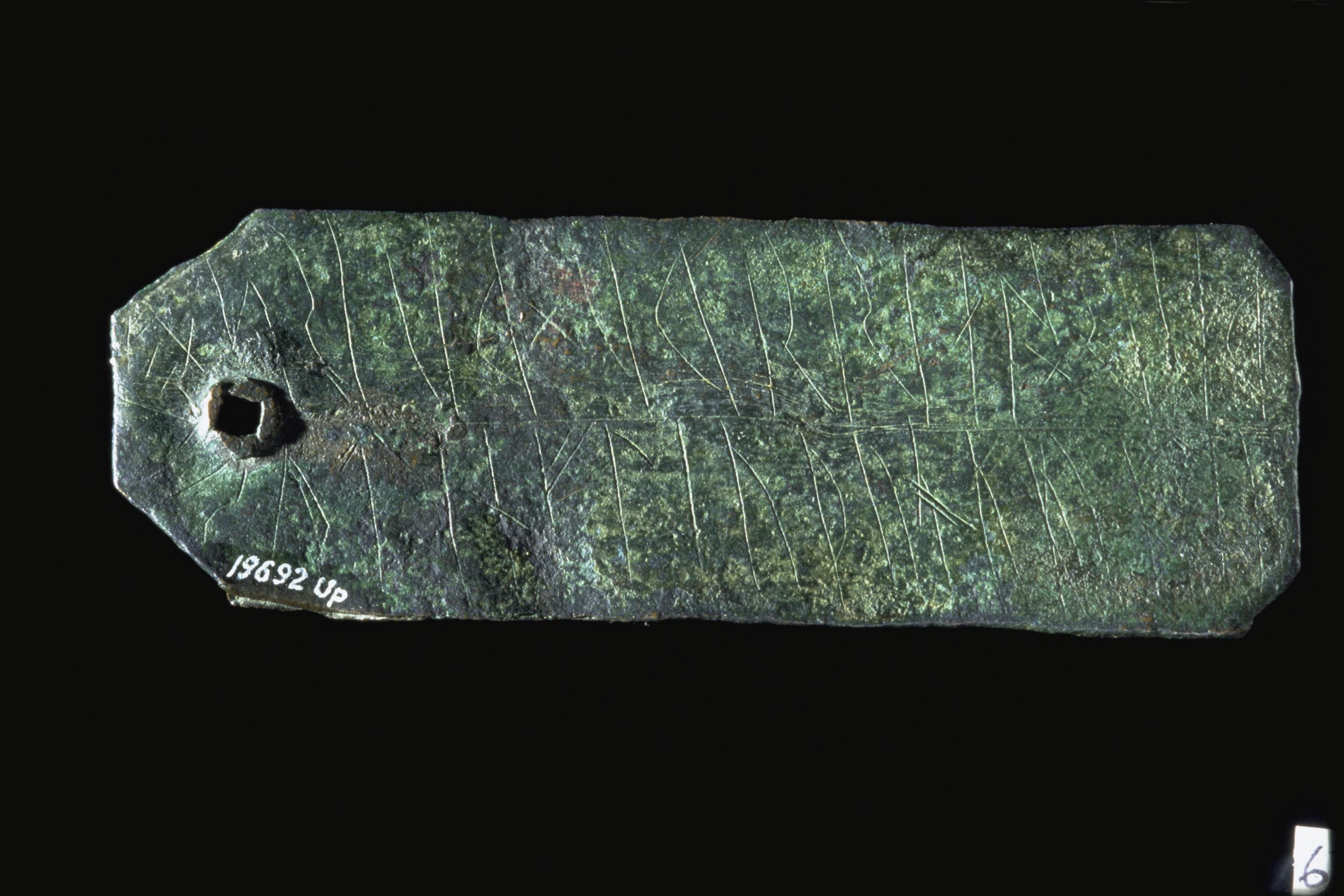
- Side A, photographed by Bengt A. Lundberg in 1996 for the Swedish National Heritage Board.
- Material: Copper
- Writing: Younger Futhark
- Created: 1000s
- Discovered: March 1931; Sigtuna, Malmen, Granhäcken
- Culture: Norse
- Rundata ID: U Fv1933;134

Text – Native
- Old Norse: See article.

Translation
- See article.

The Sigtuna amulet I or Sigtuna plate I (signum U Fv1933;134, also U Sl5 and S 5) is an 11th-century runic amulet found in 1931 in Sigtuna, Uppland.

== Description ==
The amulet is a copper plate, 82 mm long, 27.5-29mm wide and 0.9mm thick. It was discovered at a depth of c. 1.2 metres in the 'Granhäcken' block of the medieval city of Sigtuna in March 1931, together with pottery fragments and bone combs. Additional excavations of the site were undertaken later the same year, but did not reveal anything new of interest.

== Inscription ==
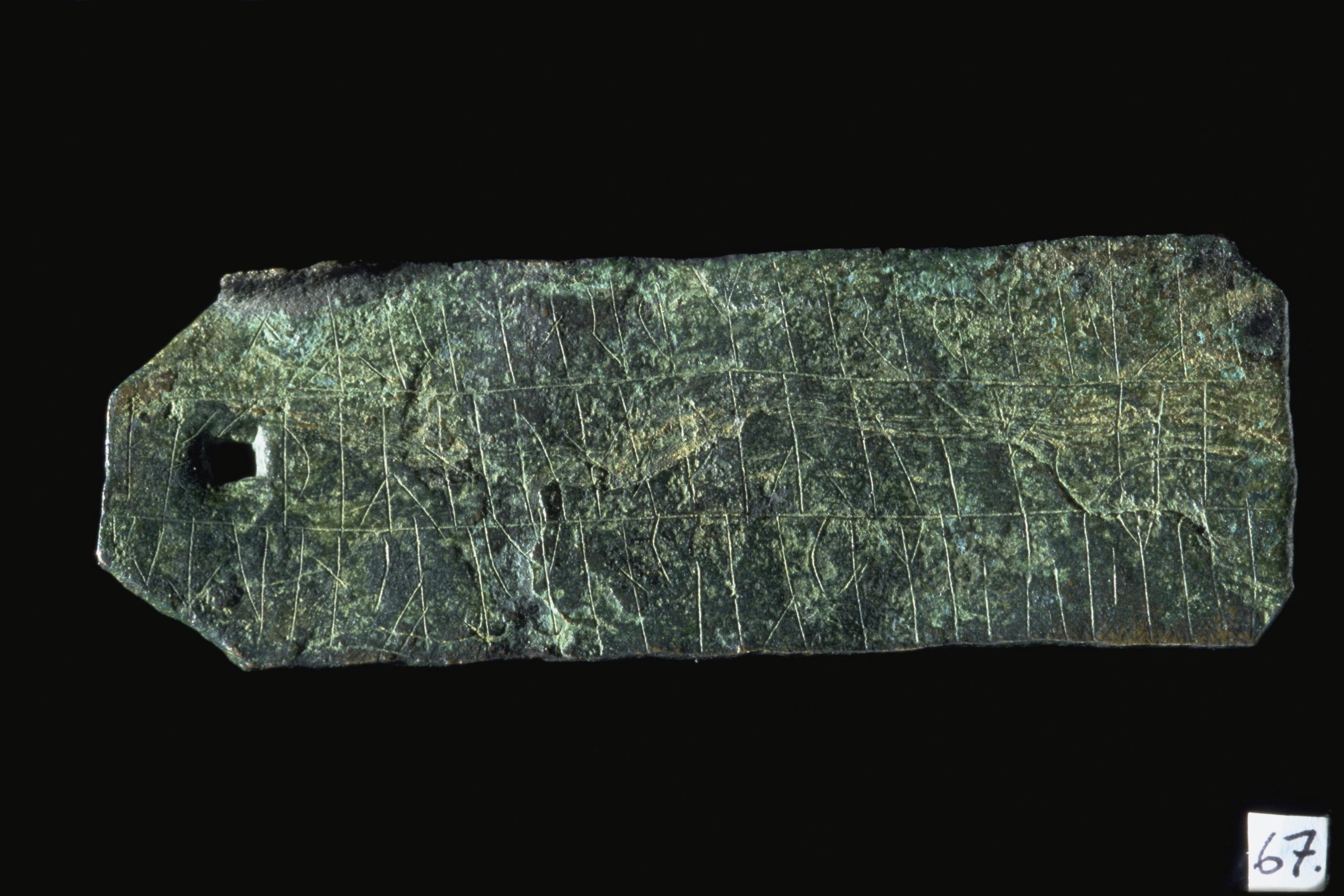
Side B of the amulet.

The inscription is carved in boustrophedon.

=== Scandinavian Runic-text Database ===
The Scandinavian Runic-text Database offers the following "standard" readings:

Transliteration:

§A þur/þurs| × |sarriþu × þursa trutin fliu þu nu=| |=funtin is
§B af þiʀ þriaʀ þraʀ ulf × ¶ af þiʀ niu noþiʀ ulfr iii ¶ isiʀ þis isiʀ auk is uniʀ ulfr niut lu¶¶fia

Old West Norse normalization

§A Þór/Þurs sárriðu, þursa dróttinn! Fljú þú nú! Fundinn er[tu].
§B Haf þér þrjár þrár, Ulfr! Haf þér níu nauðir, Ulfr! <iii isiʀ þis isiʀ auk is uniʀ>, Ulfr. Njót lyfja!

Runic Swedish normalization

§A Þór/Þurs sárriðu, þursa dróttinn! Fliú þú nú! Fundinn es[tu].
§B Haf þéʀ þríaʀ þráʀ, Ulfʀ! Haf þéʀ níu nauðiʀ, Ulfʀ! <iii isiʀ þis isiʀ auk is uniʀ>, Ulfʀ. Niút lyfia!

English translation

§A Boil/Spectre of the wound-fever, lord of the giants! Flee now! You are found.
§B Have for yourself three pangs, Wolf! Have for yourself nine needs, Wolf! <iii isiʀ þis isiʀ auk is uniʀ>, Wolf. Make good use of the healing(-charm)!

== Other interpretations ==
=== Pipping 1933 ===
Old West Norse normalization:

þurs sár-riðu, þursa dróttinn
flý þú nú fuð, fundinn es(t)
(h)af þér þríar þráar ulf
(h)af þér níu nauðir ulf
þí ísir þessir ísir
auki es unir ulfr niót lyfia

English translation:

Wound-fever’s demon, lord among demons, nunc fuge vulvam, you are found.
Content yourself with threefold torment, monster!
Content yourself with ninefold need, monster!
To that attach the íss-runes, these íss-runes, that you may stay where you are. May you be affected by (my) curses, monster!

=== Pereswetoff-Morath 2019 ===
As part of her dissertation "Viking-Age Runic Plates: Readings and Interpretations", Sofia Pereswetoff-Morath discusses this find. She offers the following interpretation:

Transliteration:

A1 þurs‿×‿sarriþu × þursa
2 trutin fliu þu nu͡funtin is
B1 af þiʀ þriaʀ þraʀ ulf ×
2 af þiʀ niu noþiʀ ulfr---
3 ifiʀ þisi siʀ auk is uniʀ ulfr niut lu ¶ fia

Runic Swedish normalization:

A Þurs sārriðu, þursa drōttinn!
Flȳ þū nū! Fundinn es (þurs sārriðu þursa drōttinn ...)
B (H)af þēʀ þrīaʀ þrāʀ, ulf, (h)af þēʀ nīu nauðiʀ!
Ulfʀ (h)æfiʀ þessi sēʀ auk es uniʀ ulfʀ. Niūt lyfia!

English translation:

A Wound-fever's troll, lord of trolls!
You flee now! Found is (the wound-fever's troll, lord of trolls ...)
B May three torments take you, wolf, may nine needs take you!
The wolf takes these (torments and needs) and with these the wolf remains calm. Use the magic charm!

== Theories ==
The inscription has been noted to have striking similarities with other Viking-age runic healing-charms, such as the Canterbury formula, written in Scandinavian runes but found in an Anglo-Saxon manuscript. It reads:

kuril sarþuara far þu nu funtin is tu þur uigi þik ¶ þorsa trutin iuril sarþuara uiþr aþra uari ·
Gyrils sārþvara far þū nū! Fundinn eʀ þū! Þōrr vīgi þik, þursa drōttinn, Gyrils sārþvara. Viðr aðravari.
Gyrill's wound-tap, you go now! You are found! May Thor hallow you, lord of the trolls. Gyrill's wound-tap. Against pus in the veins (blood poisoning).

The phrase 'nine needs' (niu noþiʀ) is attested in other instances of pagan magic, such as the inscription on the Danish Ribe healing-stick, the Icelandic poem Sigrdrífumál and spell-book Galdrabók.

== See also ==
- Kvinneby amulet
- Ribe skull fragment
