= Kvinneby amulet =

11th-century runic amulet

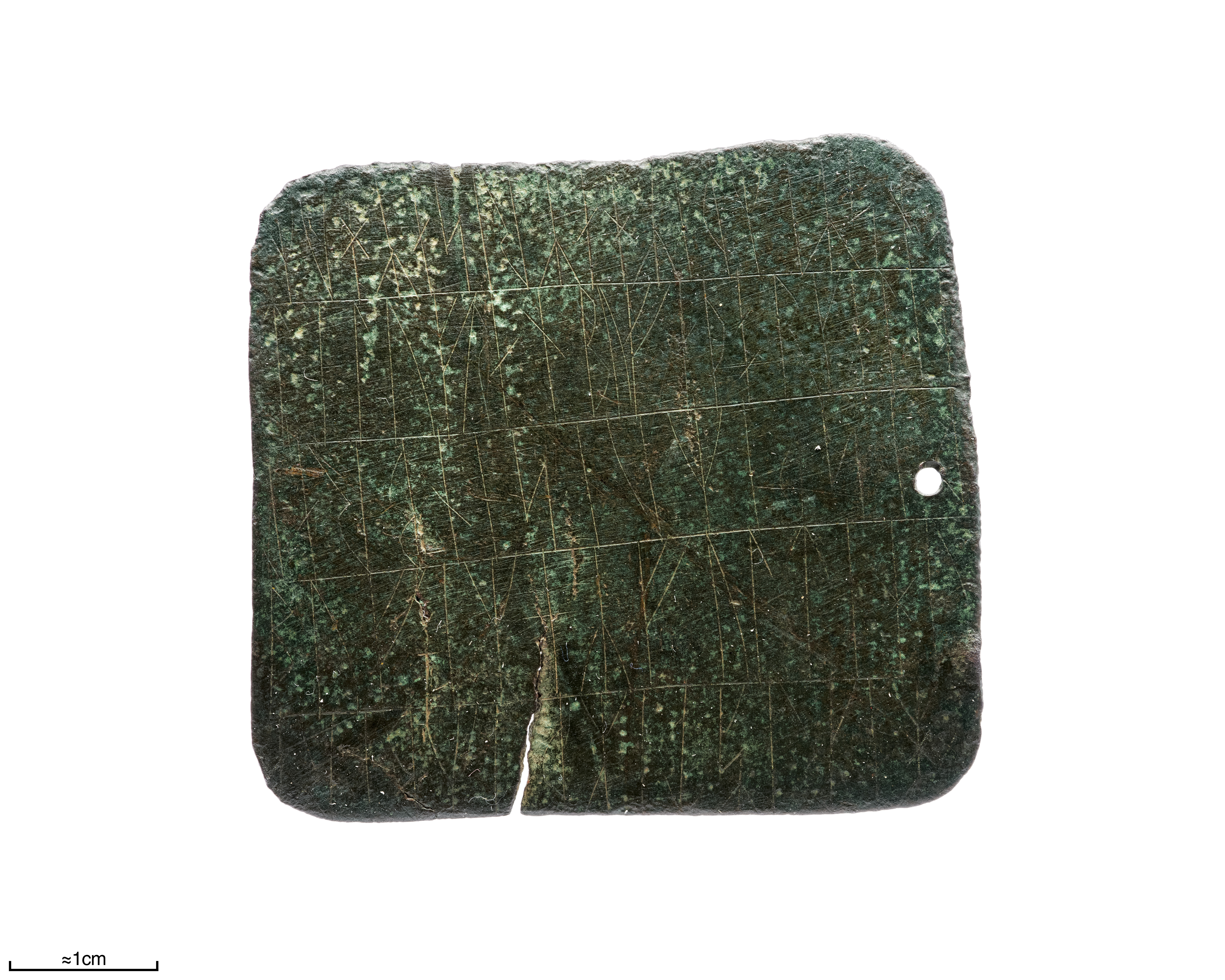
Kvinneby amulet, A-side.

The Kvinneby amulet (Öl SAS1989;43) is an 11th-century runic amulet found in the mid-1950s buried in the village of Södra Kvinneby in Öland, Sweden. The amulet is believed to date from roughly 1050–1130 CE. The amulet is a square copper plate measuring approximately 5 cm on each side. Near one edge there is a small hole, presumably used for hanging it around the neck.

== Inscription ==
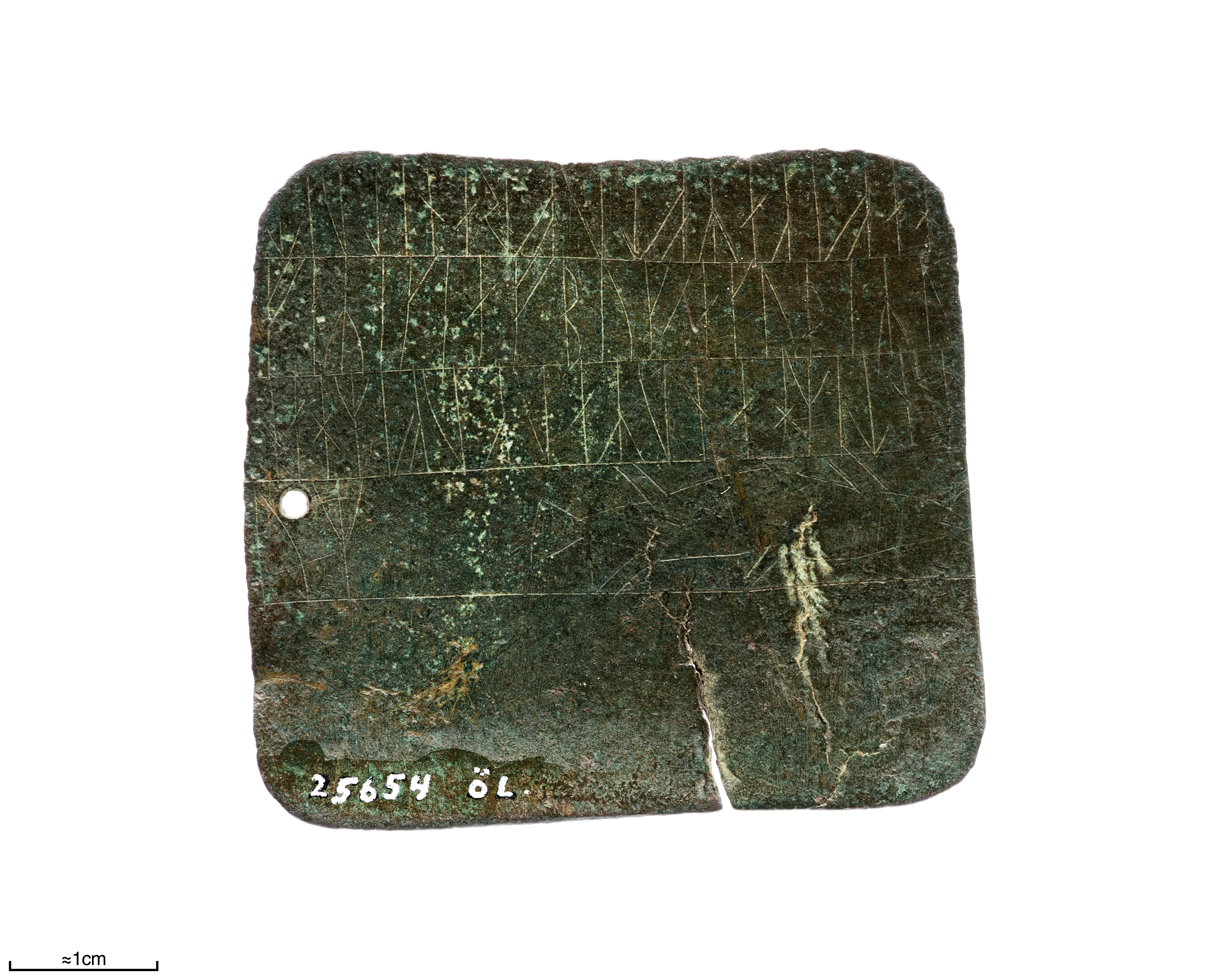
B-side of the plate, with the fish.

The inscription consists of some 143 runes, written boustrophedon, supplemented by an engraving of a fish; the relevance of the fish to the text is unclear.

The inscription is one of the longest and best preserved for its time but it has proven hard to interpret. The “official” Rundata interpretation is:

Here I carve(d) protection for you, Bófi, with/… … … to you is certain. And may the lightning hold all evil away from Bófi. May Þórr protect him with that hammer which came from out of the sea. Flee from evilness! You/it get/gets nothing from Bófi. The gods are under him and over him.

== Deciphering attempts ==
There have been six other serious attempts to decipher the text. This article treats each in turn.

=== Bruce E. Nilsson 1976 ===
Bruce E. Nilsson was the first to offer an interpretation of the amulet. Ignoring what seem to be bind runes at the start of the inscription, he offered this transliteration:

tiʀþiʀbirk
bufimiʀfultihu
risþeʀuisinbral
tilufranbufaþorketih
ansmiʀþemhamrisamhuʀ
hafikamflufraniluit
feʀekiafbufakuþiʀu
untiʀhanumaukyfiʀhan
um

and the following translation into English:

Glory to thee bear I, Bove. Help me! Who is wiser than thee? And bear all in (the form of) evil from Bove. May Thor protect him with that hammer which came from the sea, (and which) fled from evil. Wit fares not from Bove. The gods are under him and over him.

Nilsson interprets: “[T]he amulet is an invocation to the gods to protect Bove, especially while he is at sea.” This he bases on the carving of the fish, the mention of the sea in the text and the place where the amulet was found.

Nilsson understands the mention of Thor and his hammer as a reference of the story of Thor's fishing; where he threw his hammer at the head of Jörmungandr, the Midgard serpent. Since Thor's hammer always returns to its thrower it might in this case be said that it ‘fled from evil’ and ‘came from the sea’.

Nilsson does not attempt to solve the first few runic symbols of the inscription. He ventures a guess that they might conceal the name or cognomen of a god. The fish looks more promising to Nilsson. He suggests that it might contain coded runes. The fins of the fish can, according to him, be represented graphically as:

|| | ||
|| || |

This might represent the runes ‘nbh’ in some order. Nilsson suggests that the meaning is based on the names of the runes; thus the amulet should give a björg from hagl and nauð or a “deliverance” from “hail” and “need”. He adds that this is “not at all certain”.

Nilsson's interpretation is not treated critically by later authors.

=== Ivar Lindquist 1987 (a posthumous publication) ===
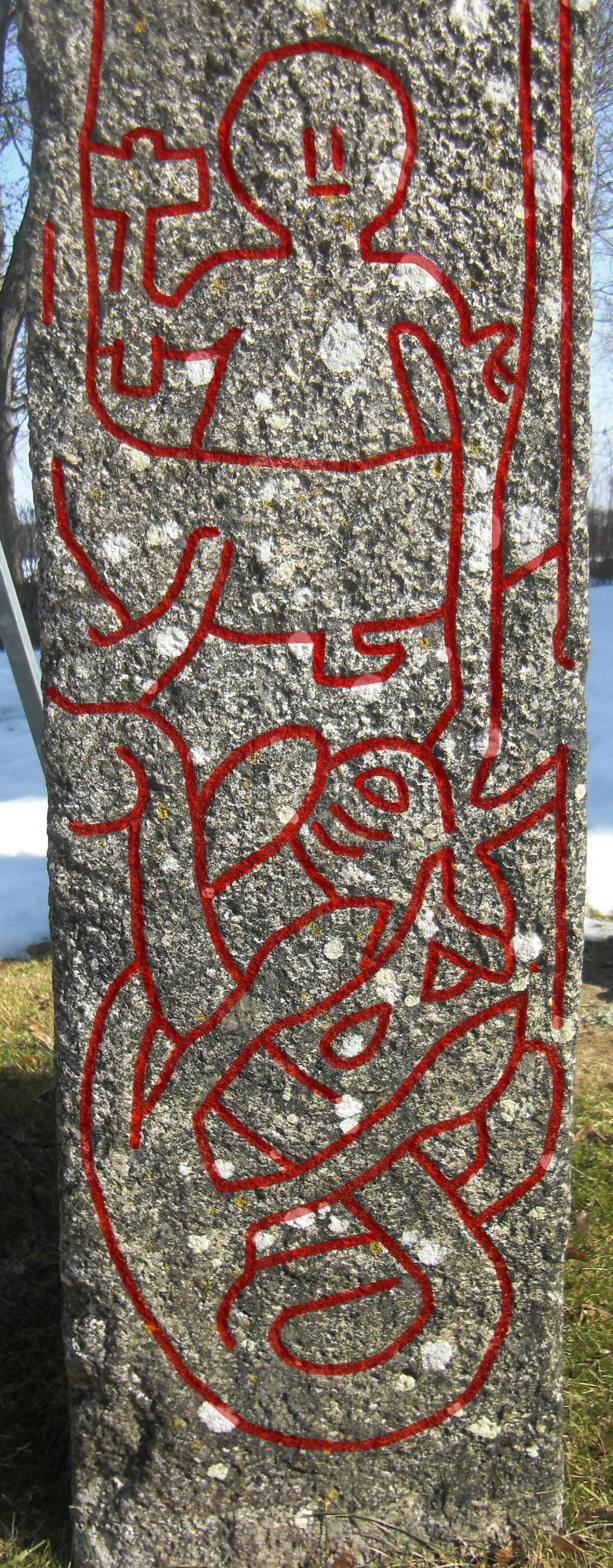
The Altuna stone, depicting Thor with his hammer.

Ivar Lindquist took some 30 years to ponder the amulet. He offers a plethora of interpretations – all, however, within the same central theme. According to Lindquist the amulet contains a solemn prayer to the Earth Goddess, referred to as ‘Erka’, ‘Fold’ and ‘Undirgoð’ (:the god beneath) and her ‘single son’ Thor.

Two of Lindquist’s suggested interpretations are:

Here I, in poetry am familiar with the god(dess) beneath, for me, Bófi, to save myself. Earth, I am known to thee! May the one son keep evil away from Bófi. May Þórr protect him with the hammer that smashes Ámr, the heavy Ámr. Flee, foul ill-wight! Get nothing from Bófi. Gods are under him and over him.

Also:

I here to Erka, the undergod of the world, for me, Bófi, to save myself. Earth, I am known to thee! And may the lightning raiser help evil from Bófi. May Þórr protect him with the hammer that smashes Ámr. Go the sea, Ámr! Flee, foul ill-wight! Get nothing from Bófi. Gods are under him and over him.

On etymological grounds Lindquist reasons that Ámr is a demon of sickness.

=== Börje Westlund 1989 ===
According to Westlund, Lindquist’s attempts at deciphering the “bind runes” at the beginning of the inscription are misguided. In Westlund’s opinion these are not complicated bind runes but elaborate forms of normal runes. To support his claim he compares the runes with an inscription found near Novgorod in 1983 and treated by the Russian runologist Elena Melnikova in 1987. This is material not available to Lindquist and Nilsson.

Westlund reads the first runes as “hiristikþirbirkbufi” and takes them to mean (in standardized West Norse) “Hér rísti ek þér björg Bófi,” which would come out in English as “Here I carve protection for you, Bófi.” This is a major change from Lindquist's interpretation. Instead of Bófi being the carver talking about himself we have a separate carver that addresses Bófi in the inscription.

Westlund goes on to refuse Lindquist’s “prayer to Earth” in favor of a more magical interpretation. While he rejects Lindquist’s interpretation of “meRfultihuþis” (“with Earth in mind”) and Nilsson’s interpretation of “samhuRhafikam” (“that came from the sea”) he does not offer alternative explanations. On the whole he suggests that Lindquist read too much into the inscription and tries to go for a more “mundane” solution to the problem. His transliteration and translation of the whole inscription follow:

x hiristik þiʀ birk / bufi meʀ fultihu / þis þeʀ uis in bral / tilu fran bufa þor keti h / ans miʀ þem hamri samhuʀ / hafikam fly fran iluit feʀ eki af bufa kuþ iʀu / untiʀ hanum auk yfiʀ han / um

Here I may carve (or: I carved) protection for you, Bófi, with … is certain to you. And may the lightning keep evil (away) from Bófi. Thor Protect him with that hammer … Flee from the evil being! It (?) gets nothing from Bófi. Gods are under him and over him.

In his conclusion Westlund rejects Lindquist’s view of the amulet as a solemn heathen prayer. In his opinion the mention of Thor and ‘the gods’ reflects a post-conversion magical view of the heathen gods. He even goes as far as suggesting that the wearer of the amulet was probably a baptised Christian.

=== Ottar Grønvik 1992 ===
In 1992 Ottar Grønvik offered a new interpretation which is essentially an attempt to rehabilitate Lindquist's work. Lindquist's bind-runes are brought back into play.

h(i)ʀiurkimsutiʀkuþiʀbirk
bufimeʀfultihu
þisþeʀuisinbral
tilufranbufaþorketih
ansmiʀþemhamrisamhyʀ
hafikamflyfraniluit
feʀekiafbufakuþiʀu
untiʀhanumaukyfiʀhan
um

=== Jonna Louis-Jensen 2001 ===
In 2001 Jonna Louis-Jensen continued in the same vein as Grønvik with an interpretation involving a sickness demon named Ámr. She offers the following normalized text and English translation.

H(ǣ)ʀ'k ī kūri (ī)ms undiʀ guþi, (æ)ʀ ber'k Būfi mǣʀ fūlt ī hūþ - es þǣʀ vīs in brā - <h>alt illu frān Būfa! Þōrr gǣti hans mēʀ þæm hamri (e)s Ām hyʀ! Haf ekka, Ām! Flȳ frān, illvētt! Fæʀ ækki af Būfa; guþ eʀu undiʀ hānum auk yfiʀ hānum.	I cower herein, under the god of soot; I, Būfi, carry a festering sore in my skin - you know where the glistening one is - keep evil from Būfi! May Thor guard him with the hammer with which he strikes Āmr. May you have the affliction, Āmr! Be gone, evil being! The affliction leaves Būfi, there are gods below him and above him.

=== Pereswetoff-Morath 2019 ===
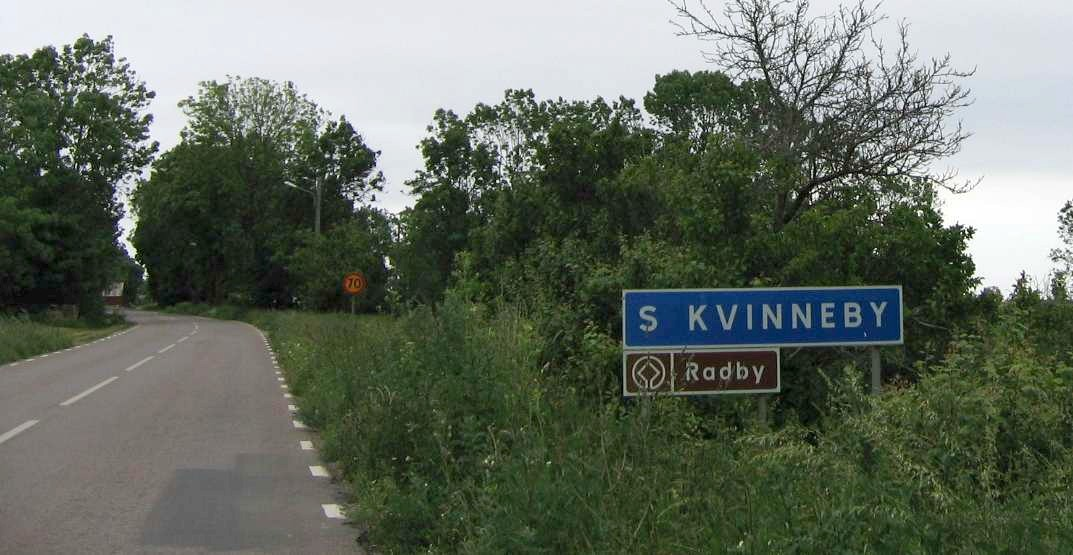
Southern Kvinneby

As part of her dissertation “Viking-Age Runic Plates: Readings and Interpretations”, Sofia Pereswetoff-Morath discusses this find. She chooses to read the “bindrunes” at the start as a form of encryption which introduces meaningless staves to make reading more difficult, noting that bindrunes occur nowhere else in the inscription, even in places where they would have been useful. She advocates for a broad dating of 1050–1130.

Her reading most closely resembles that of Bruce E. Nilsson, disregarding all speculation about a demon Ámr.

A1 ᛭ hir‿ristiʀ͡k þiʀ birg 2 bufi miʀ fulti‿i hu 3 r is þeʀ uis in bra‿al 4 t ilu fran bufa þor keti h 5 ans miʀ þem hamri sam huʀ B1 hafi kam fly fran ilu‿uit 2 feʀ eki af bufa kuþ iʀu 3 untiʀ hanum auk yfiʀ han 4 um	Hēr rīst ek/rīsti’k þēʀ berg, Bōfi, meðʀ fulltȳ(i). Hyrr es þēʀ vīss, en brā allt illu frān Bōfa. Þōrr gǣti hans meðʀ þēm hamri sæm ūʀ hafi kam! Flȳ frān illu! Vitt fǣr ækki af Bōfa. Guð eʀu undiʀ hānum auk yfir hān- um

English: ”Here I carve (may I carve/carved) help for you, Bove, with complete assistance. Fire is safe for you (known to you), (the fire which) took all evil away from Bove. May Thor protect him with the hammer which came from the sea. Flee from the evil one! Magic (evil) achieves nothing with Bove. Gods are under him and over him.”

== See also ==
- Ribe skull fragment
- Runic magic
- Seeland-II-C
- Sigtuna amulet I
- Solberga plates
- Högstena plates
