= Hercules' Club =

Hercules' Club or Hercules' club may refer to:

== Plants ==
- Aralia spinosa, also known as Hercules' club, prickly ash, and other names
- Zanthoxylum clava-herculis, also known as Hercules' club, Southern prickly ash, and other names

== Other uses ==
- Hercules' Club, also known as Hercules' Bludgeon, a 25-metre-high limestone column in Ojców National Park, Poland
- Hercules' Club (amulet), a Roman and Migration era artefact type

== See also ==
- Pyrazus ebeninus, also known as Hercules club mud whelk
