= Mjölnir =

Hammer of the god Thor in Norse mythology

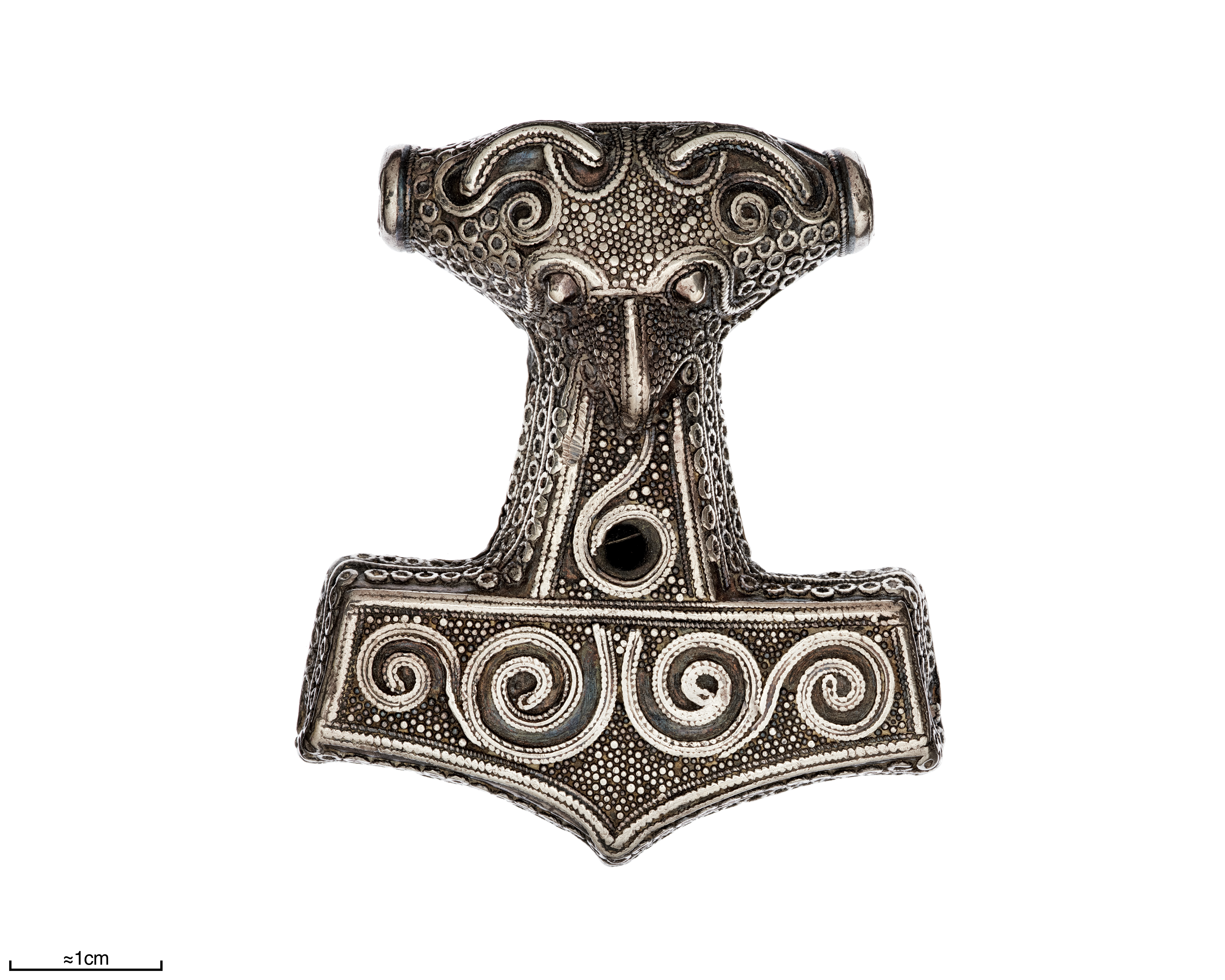
A silver-gilded Thor's hammer found in Scania, Sweden, that once belonged to the collection of Baron Claes Kurck.

Mjölnir or Mjolnir (UK: /ˈmjɒlnɪər/ MYOL-neer, US: /ˈmjɔːlnɪər/ MYAWL-neer; from Old Norse Mjǫllnir [ˈmjɔlːnir]) is the hammer of the thunder god Thor in Norse mythology, used both as a devastating weapon and as a divine instrument to provide blessings. The hammer is attested in numerous sources, including the 11th century runic Kvinneby amulet, the Poetic Edda, a collection of eddic poetry compiled in the 13th century, and the Prose Edda, a collection of prose and poetry compiled in the 13th century.

The hammer was commonly worn as a pendant during the Viking Age in the Scandinavian cultural sphere, sometimes called a Thor's hammer (cf. Swedish: torshammare, "Mjölnir pendant"), and Thor and his hammer occur depicted on a variety of objects from the archaeological record. Today the symbol appears in a wide variety of media and is again worn as a pendant by various groups, including adherents of modern Heathenry.

== Etymology ==
The etymology of the hammer's name, Mjǫllnir, is disputed among historical linguists. Old Norse Mjǫllnir developed from Proto-Norse *melluniaR and one proposed derivation connects this form to Old Church Slavonic mlunuji and Russian molnija meaning 'lightning' (either borrowed from a Slavic source or both stemming from a common source) and subsequently yielding the meaning 'lightning-maker'. Another proposal connects Mjǫllnir to Old Norse mjǫll meaning 'new snow' and modern Icelandic mjalli meaning 'the color white', rendering Mjǫllnir as 'shining lightning weapon'. Finally, another proposal connects Old Norse Mjǫllnir to Old Norse mala meaning 'to grind' and Gothic malwjan 'to grind', yielding Mjǫllnir as meaning 'the grinder'.

== Attestations ==
=== Kvinneby amulet ===
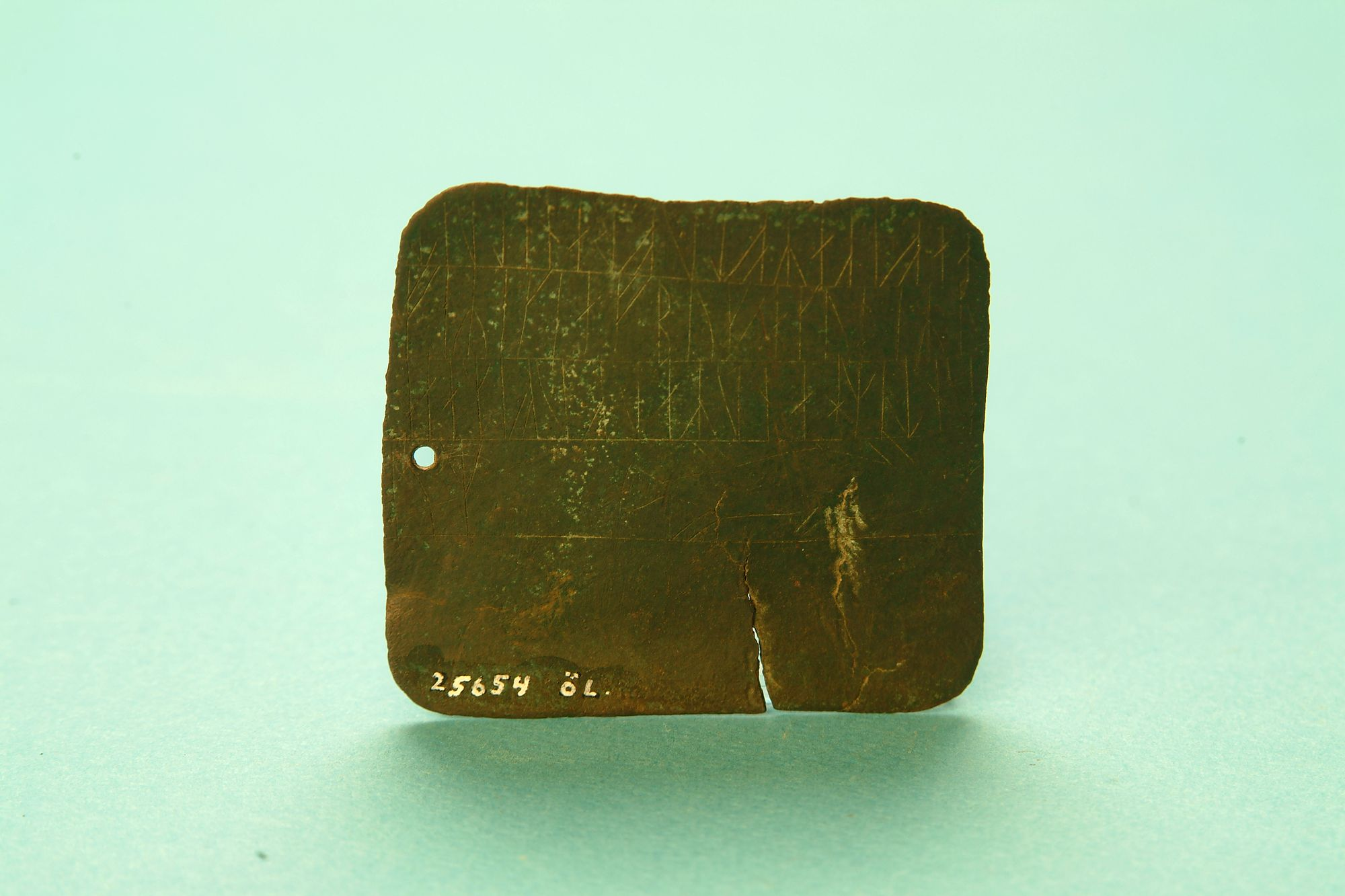
One side of the Kvinneby amulet

Likely worn around the neck, the Kvinneby amulet is a small copper amulet found in Öland, Sweden that dates from the 11th century and features an Old Norse Younger futhark inscription that invokes Thor and his hammer. Runologists Mindy MacLeod and Bernard Mees translate the amulet as follows:

'Here I carve for you (runes of) help, Bofi.
Help me! Knowledge (?) is certain for you.
And may the lightning hold all evil away from Bofi.
May Thor protect him with his hammer which came from out of the sea.
Flee from evil! It (?) gets nothing from Bofi.
The gods are under him and over him.'

The amulet inscription references narratives recorded hundreds of years later in both the Poetic Edda and Prose Edda (see discussion regarding Hymiskviða and Gylfaginning below).

=== Poetic Edda ===
In the Poetic Edda, Mjölnir is mentioned in the eddic poems Vafþrúðnismál, Hymiskviða, Lokasenna, and Þrymskviða. In a stanza from Vafþrúðnismál, the wise jötunn Vafþrúðnir tells the disguised god Odin that after the events of Ragnarök, Móði and Magni, sons of Thor, will wield Mjölnir:

Benjamin Thorpe 1866 translation: Vidar and Vali will the gods' holy fanes inhabit, when Surt's fires will be quenched. Môdi and Magni will Miöllnir possess, and warfare strive to end.	Henry Adams Bellows 1923 translation: "In the gods' home Vithar and Vali shall dwell, When the fires of Surt have sunk; Mothi and Magni shall Mjollnir have When Vingnir falls in fight."	Carolyne Larrington 2014 revised translation: 'Vidar and Vali will live in the gods' sanctuaries, when Surt's fire is slaked; Modi and Magni shall have Miollnir and demonstrate battle-strength.'

In Hymiskviða, after gaining a tremendous cauldron that the jötunn (and personified ocean) Ægir has requested so that he may brew the gods ale, Thor battles malicious jötnar with the hammer (referred to here as whales as a poetic device):

Benjamin Thorpe 1866 translation: From his shoulders he lifted the kettle down; Miöllnir hurled forth towards the savage crew, and slew all the mountain-giants, who with Hýimir had him pursued.	Henry Adams Bellows 1923 translation: He stood and cast from his back the kettle, And Mjollnir, the lover of murder, he wielded;. . . . . . . . . . . . . . . . . . . So all the whales of the waste he slew.	Carolyne Larrington 2014 revised translation: He lifted from his shoulders the outstanding cauldron, he swung Miollnir before him, keen to kill, and he struck down all the lava-whales.

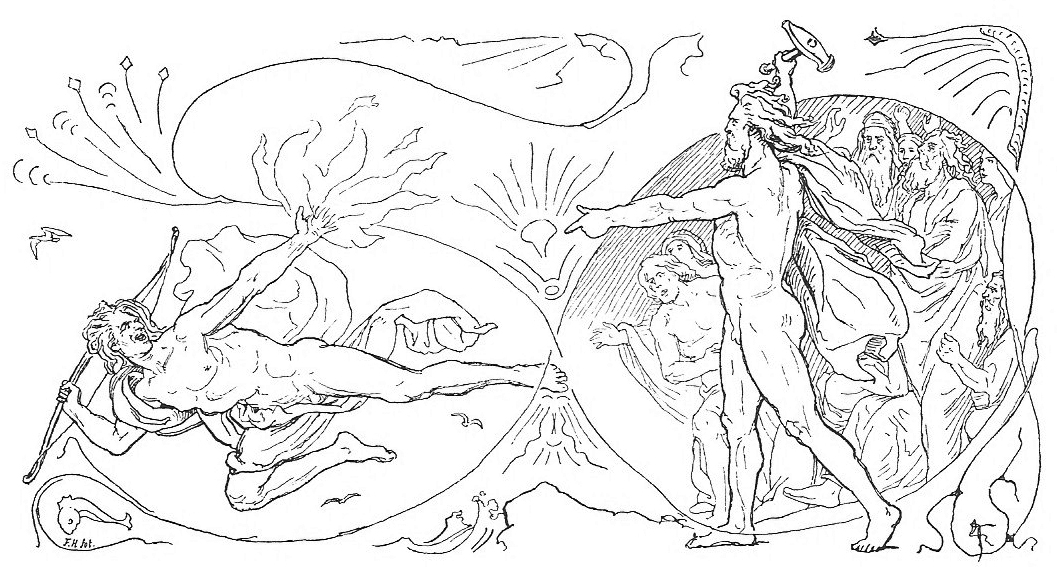
Thor raises his hammer as Loki leaves Ægir's hall, by Frølich (1895)

In Lokasenna, in which the deity Loki and other gods trade insults (see flyting). In the poem, the gods threaten Loki with Mjölnir as part of a refrain repeated in all four stanzas in which he speaks.

The hammer is a focal point of the eddic poem Þrymskviða. In the poem, Thor wakes one day to find that his hammer is missing. Furious, the god pulls his beard, shakes his head, and searches for the absent weapon. Thor consults with Loki, informing him that only he knows that his hammer is missing.

Thor and Loki go to the goddess Freyja, and Loki asks her if he might use her feather garment. Freyja readily agrees, Loki puts on the cloak, and flies to Jötunheimr. There he finds the jötunn Þrymr sitting on a burial mound and caring for his animals.

The two speak, and Þrymr confirms to Loki that he has stolen the hammer. Þrymr says that he has buried it deep in the ground and no one will ever get it back unless they bring him Freyja to be his wife. Loki flies back to Asgard and meets with Thor. Thor asks Loki if he has any news, and Loki tells Thor Þrymr's ultimatum.

Thor and Loki go to Freyja. One of the two asks Freyja to put on a bridal head-dress and come with them to Jötunheim. Freyja is so enraged by this request that the hall shakes, and her necklace, Brísingamen, breaks off. The goddess refuses.

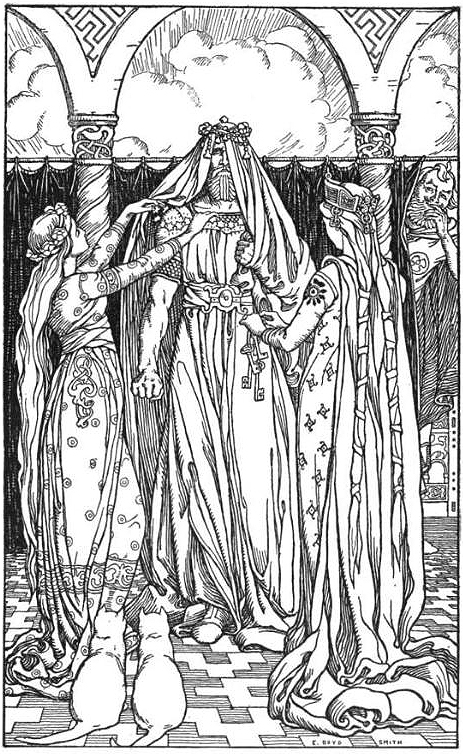
Ah, what a lovely maid it is! (1902) by Elmer Boyd Smith: Thor is unhappily dressed by the goddess Freyja and her attendants as herself

The gods meet together in counsel (see Thing (assembly)) and discuss how to get the hammer back. The god Heimdallr proposes that Thor put on a bridal head-dress and wear Brísingamen as if he were Freyja. Thor initially rejects the proposal, but Loki convinces him that if he doesn't, the jötnar in Jötunheim who stole his hammer will soon call Asgard their home. The gods dress Thor in bridal gear, Loki dresses as "Freyja's" maid to accompany him, and the two drive Thor's goat-led wagon to Jötunheimr, producing flames and splitting mountains along the way.

From the hall yard, Þrymr spots the duo arriving and tells his retinue to prepare by tossing straw on the hall benches. That night, Þrymr says that he is surprised to find his bride-to-be ferociously eating and drinking, consuming nine entrees—one ox and eight salmon—and three casks of mead. Loki responds that "Freyja" had neither drank nor eaten for eight nights before this one as she was so eager to come to Jötunheimr.

Þrymr lifts "Freyja"'s bridal veil to kiss her, only to spring back: The bride's eyes were "terrifying", as if "fire is burning from them". The disguised Loki explains this was because "Freyja" had not slept for eight nights before this one, because she was so eager to arrive in Jötunheim (on the topic of the numbers three and nine in Norse myth, see numbers in Norse mythology).

Finally, Þrymr calls for Mjölnir to be brought forth to sanctify the bride with the assistance of the goddess Vár:

Benjamin Thorpe 1866 translation: Then said Thrym, the Thursars's lord: Bring the hammer in, the bride to consecrate; lay Miöllnir on the maiden's knee; unite us each with other by the hand of Vör.	Henry Adams Bellows 1923 translation: Then loud spake Thrym, the giants' leader: "Bring in the hammer to hallow the bride; On the maiden's knees let Mjollnir lie, That us both the hand of Vor may bless."	Carolyne Larrington 2014 revised translation: Then said Thrym, lord of ogres. 'Bring in the hammer to sanctify the bride, lay Miollnir on the girl's lap. concentrate us together by the hand of Var!'

"Freyja" sees the hammer and laughs internally before grabbing it, killing Þrymr and another jötunn, and pummeling the gathered wedding guests. The poem ends with a prose note indicating that this is how the god got his hammer back.

=== Prose Edda ===
Mjölnir receives mention throughout the Prose Edda books Gylfaginning and Skáldskaparmál.

==== Gylfaginning ====
Early in Gylfaginning, High describes the god Thor and his "three special possessions": his hammer Mjölnir, his iron gloves Járngreipr, and his belt Megingjörð. High explains that Thor must wear his gloves with his hammer, and that Mjölnir is well known among the jötnar due to the skulls of many jötunn it has smashed over time.

The enthroned figure of Third reluctantly relates a tale in which Thor and Loki are riding in Thor's chariot, pulled by his two goats, Tanngrisnir and Tanngnjóstr. Loki and Thor stop at the home of a peasant farmer, and there they are given lodging for a night. Thor slaughters his goats, skins them and puts them in a pot. When the goats are cooked, Loki and Thor sit down for their evening meal. Thor invites the peasant family to share the meal with him and they do so.

At the end of the meal, Thor places the skins of the goat on the opposing side of the fire and tells the peasants to throw the bones of the goats on to the goatskins. The peasant's son Þjálfi takes one of the goat ham-bones and uses a knife to split it open, breaking the bone to get to the marrow. After staying the night at the peasants house, Thor wakes up and gets dressed before the break of dawn. Thor takes the hammer Mjölnir, raises it, and blesses the goat skins. Resurrected, the goats stand, but one of the two goats is lame in the hind leg. Noting this new lameness, Thor exclaims that someone has mistreated the bones of his goats; that someone broke the ham-bone during the meal the night before.

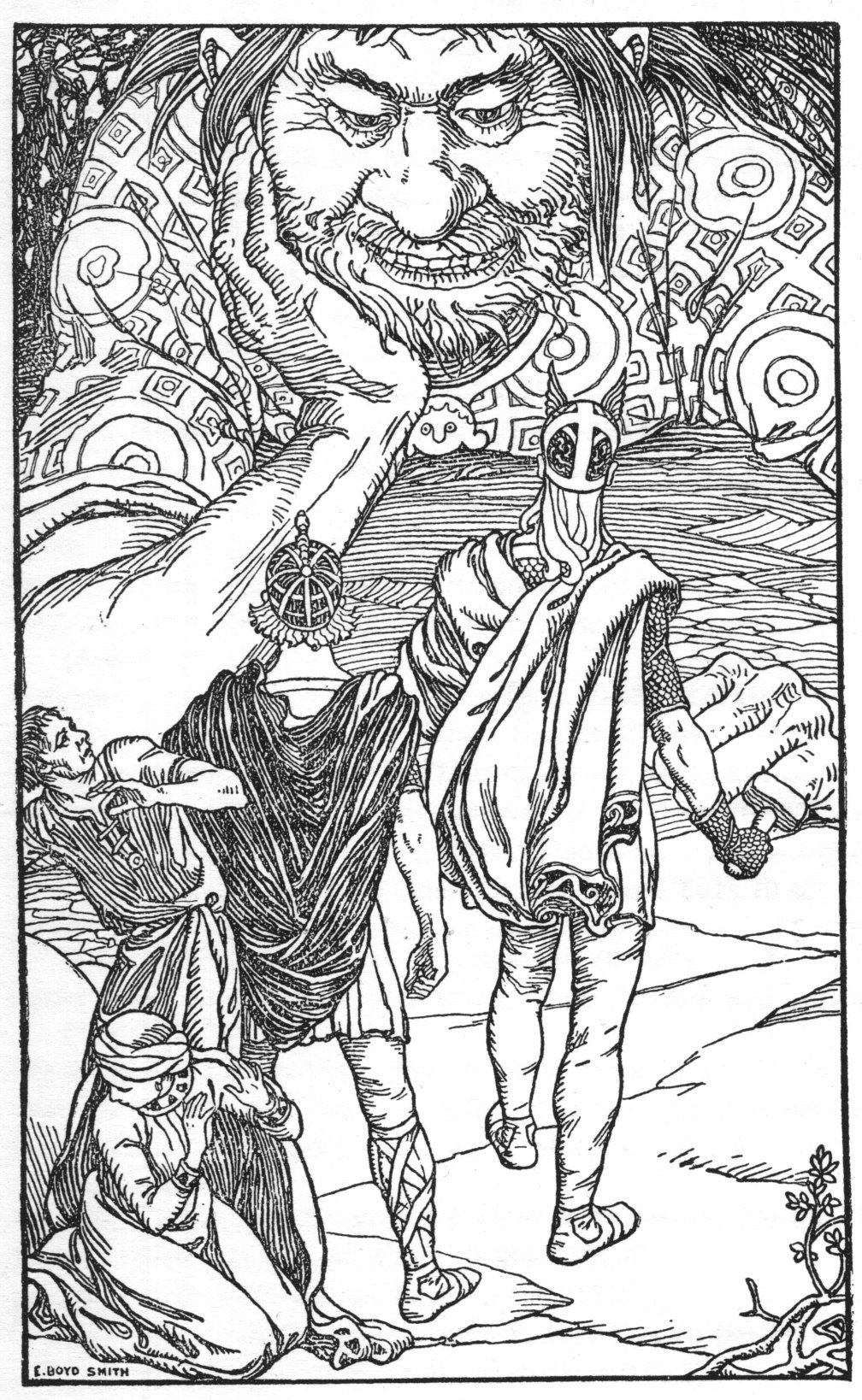
Þjálfi and Röskva turn away in fear as Thor and Loki face the immense jötunn Skrymir in an illustration (1902) by Elmer Boyd Smith.

In a tale recounted by Third, the gods Loki and Thor, along with Thor's servants Þjálfi and Röskva, encounter an enormous forest when they arrive in Jötunheimr. The group has difficulty finding lodging until they encounter a huge and peculiar building with a very wide entrance. They decide to spend the night in the structure. At midnight they experience an earthquake and decide to search the building. They find nothing. Mjölnir in hand, Thor guards the hall's entrance until the crew hears intense groaning and rumbling.

At dawn, Thor leaves the hall and sees an enormous man asleep and loudly snoring. Thor realizes he had in fact heard the snoring of this tremendous man. The god puts on his belt, his strength increases, and the man stands. Seeing his height, Third says that "and the say that Thor was for once was afraid to strike him with the hammer, and asked him for his name". The large man says that his name is Skrýmir and reveals that Thor, Loki, Þjálfi, and Röskva had slept not in a hall but rather in Skrýmir's glove.

Skrýmir tells Thor that he doesn't need to introduce himself because he already knows that he is Thor. Later in the trip, Thor attacks Skrýmir as he sleeps in three separate occasions: In the first instance, Skrýmir awakes and asks if a leaf has fallen on his head; in the second instance, Skrýmir awakes and asks if an acorn fell on his head; and on the third and final instance, Skrýmir asks if birds above him may have knocked twigs down on to his head.

Later Skrýmir reveals that this had all been an illusion: For example, the enormous Skrýmir was in fact the sorcerer Útgarða-Loki and the blows Thor landed terrified him: He details that had they hit him, they would have killed him, and that his blows had hammered a deep valley in the landscape.

Gylfaginning contains a retelling of the material found in Hymiskviða (discussed above). In this version, Thor throws his hammer and strikes off the head of the great serpent Jörmungandr. Third notes, however, that he does not believe that this occurred: Third says he believes that the serpent still lives in the sea, coiled around the world.

Later in Gylfaginning, High recounts the death and ship funeral of the god Baldr. The gods are unable to move the ship on their own, and so request that the powerful jötunn Hyrrokkin comes from Jötunheim to help. Hyrrokin arrives riding a wolf with vipers as reins, and pushes the ship; though it launches from her first touch, the push also causes intense flames and earthquakes. This infuriates Thor: He desires to crush Hyyrokkin's skull with his hammer but the other gods convince him not to attack her.

Baldr's body is carried on to the ship. Baldr's wife, the goddess Nanna, sees it, and she dies of sorrow. The assembled place her with Baldr on the ship's pyre, before lighting it. Thor consecrates the burning ship with his hammer. A dwarf named Lit runs before his feet, and he kicks him into the flames, where he burns.

Gylfaginning concludes with a foretelling of the events of Ragnarök, during which the world suffers from cataclysm and disasters before returning green and beautiful. High describes the return of various gods after Ragnarök, including Thor's sons Móði and Magni, who return to Asgard holding their father's hammer, Mjölnir. This account quotes the Völuspá stanza above.

==== Skáldskaparmál ====
The Prose Edda book Skáldskaparmál contains a few mentions of the hammer, including an instance of its mention in skaldic poetry. A section dedicated to kennings used by poets to refer to the god says that Thor can be referred to as "ruler and owner" of Mjölnir.

The section cites a piece from 9th century skald Bragi Boddason that references the hammer:

Oflugbardi's terrifier [Thor] lifted his hammer in his right hand when he recognized the coal-fish that bounds all lands [the Midgard serpent].

The section also cites a piece from Gamli gnævaðarskáld who mentions the hammer:

While Bilskirnir's lord, who never nursed treachery in his heart, did quickly destroy the sea-bed-fish [Midgard serpent] with gorge-whales [giant's] bane [Miollnir].

Skáldskaparmál provides an account of Thor's use of Mjölnir in a fight with the jötunn Hrungnir. In it, after the gods had grown tired of Hrungnir's obnoxious boasting in Asgard, they call on Thor, who immediately appears, his hammer raised. Thor ultimately duels Hrungnir, and to the duel Hrungnir brings a whetstone as a weapon. Thor throws the hammer at Hrungnir and Hrungnir responds by throwing the whetstone at Thor, and Mjölnir splits it in two. One part of the whetstone becomes the predecessor of all whetstones, whereas the other part lodges itself into Thor's head. Meanwhile, Mjölnir smashes Hrungnir's skull into fragments.

In reference to this tale, the section provides extended excerpts from Haustlöng, a piece attributed to 10th century skald Þjóðólfr of Hvinir. Þjóðólfr's poem mentions Mjölnir in a few different instances, such as "The rock-gentlemen [giant] did not have to wait long after that for a swift blow from the tough multitude-smashing friend [Thor] of hammer-face-troll [Miollnir]" and "There sank down the gully-land [mountain] prince [giant] before the tough hammer and the rock-Dane-breaker [Thor] forced back the mighty defiant one."

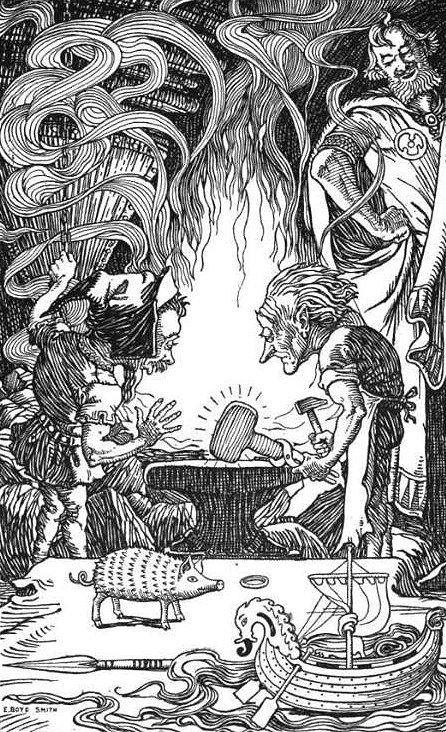
The third gift — an enormous hammer (1902) by Elmer Boyd Smith. The bottom right corner depicts the ship Skíðblaðnir "afloat" the goddess Sif's new hair.

Skáldskaparmál also contains a prose account of Thor's encounter with Geirröðr: The prose introduction notes that Thor arrived at Geirröðr's courts without his hammer. In its place, he uses a pole given to him by his jötunn lover, Gríðr.

The final mention of the hammer in Skáldskaparmál offers an explanation of its manufacture by the dwarf brothers Eitri and Brokkr. In this narrative, Loki cuts the goddess Sif's hair. Upon discovering this, Thor grabs Loki and threatens to crush every bone in his body if he does not come up with a solution. Loki goes to the svartálfar, and for him the Sons of Ivaldi make three special items: Sif's hair of gold, Freyr's ship Skíðblaðnir, and Odin's spear Gungnir.

Seeing this, Loki wagers his head with the dwarf Brokkr on whether his brother Eitri can make three more items of equal quality. As Eitri works on the three precious objects, a fly enters the room and bites him three times: First, the fly lands on the dwarf's arm and bites it, but Brokkr does not react: He places a pig skin in the forge and from it pulls the golden boar Gullinbursti; second, the fly lands on and bites the back of the dwarf's neck, but he does not react: after inserting gold, he pulls from the forge Draupnir, a golden ring that produces eight more of itself every nine nights; and third and final, the fly lands on the dwarf's eyelid and bites him, causing blood to obscure his vision. Nonetheless, Brokkr inserts iron into the forge and pulls from it a hammer, Mjölnir.

The gods Odin, Thor, and Freyr assemble to judge the quality of these items. While reviewing items and explaining their function, Brokkr says the following about Mjölnir:

Then he gave Thor the hammer and said he would be able to strike as heavily as he liked, whatever the target, and the hammer would not fail, and if he threw it at something, it would never miss, and never fly so far that it would not find its way back to his hand, and if he liked, it was so small that it could be kept inside his shirt. But there was this defect in it that the end of the hammer was rather short.

The three assembled gods judge the hammer to be the best of all the objects, and the tale continues without further mention of the object.

== Archaeological record ==
=== Hammer pendants, rings, coins, typology, taxonomy, and Eitri database ===
Around 1000 pendants in distinctive shapes representing the hammer of Thor have been unearthed in what are today the Nordic countries, England, northern Germany, the Baltic countries and Russia. Most have very simple designs in iron or silver. Around 100 have more advanced designs with ornaments. The pendants have been found in a variety of contexts (including at urban sites, and in hoards) and occur in a variety of shapes. As of 2004, 10% of all finds were from graves, nearly all of which are cremations. The burials are often identified as women's graves. In addition to pendants, the hammer has been found depicted on objects such as on two Arabic coins found at an urban dig site.

Here are four examples of Mjölnir finds, their dating, and their discovery context:

Location discovered	Material & decoration	Dating	Other information	Ref(s)
Verdal Municipality, Trøndelag, Norway	Silver, decorated	Undated	Stray find	
Hilde, Stryn Municipality, Norway	Ring with nine hammers	10th century	Found in a female cremation burial in a boat in a mound	
Kaupang, Larvik Municipality, Norway	Iron, undecorated	Around 800–960	None	
Købelev, Lolland Municipality, Denmark	Inscription	10th century	Only hammer found with a runic inscription; the text says "Hmar × is", meaning "This is a hammer".	

In 1999, German archaeologist Jörn Staecker proposed a typology for the hammer finds based on decorative style and material properties (such as amber, iron, or silver). In 2019, American scholar Katherine Suzanne Beard proposed an extension of the typology based on factors such as hammer shape and suspension type. In 2019, Beard also launched Eitri: The Norse Artifacts Database, an online database that lists numerous hammer finds and includes data about their composition and discovery context.

The development of the hammer pendants has been the subject of study by a variety of scholars. The hammers amulets appear to have developed from an earlier tradition of similar pendants among the north Germanic peoples. Scholars have also noted that the hammer may have developed from a pendant worn by other ancient Germanic people, the so-called club of Hercules amulet. The increase in popularity of the amulet in the Viking Age and some variants of it shape may have been a response to the use of Christian cross pendants appearing more commonly in the region during the process of Christianization.

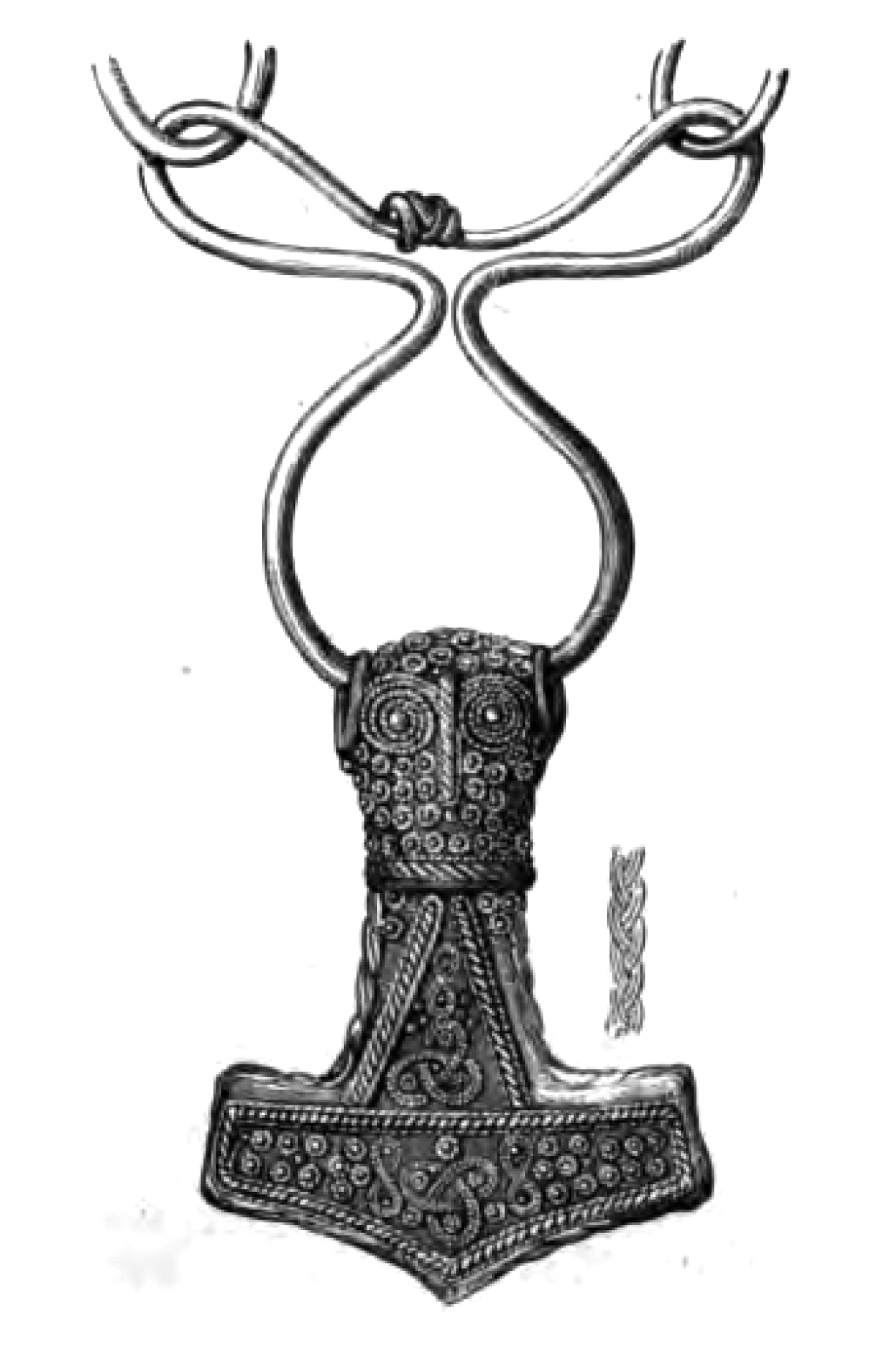
Drawing of a 4.6 cm gold-plated silver Mjölnir pendant found at Bredsätra on Öland, Sweden

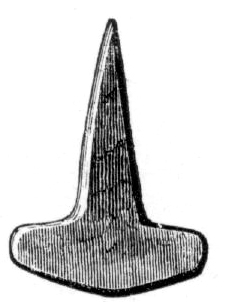
Drawing of a silver Thor's hammer amulet found in Fitjar, Hordaland, Norway

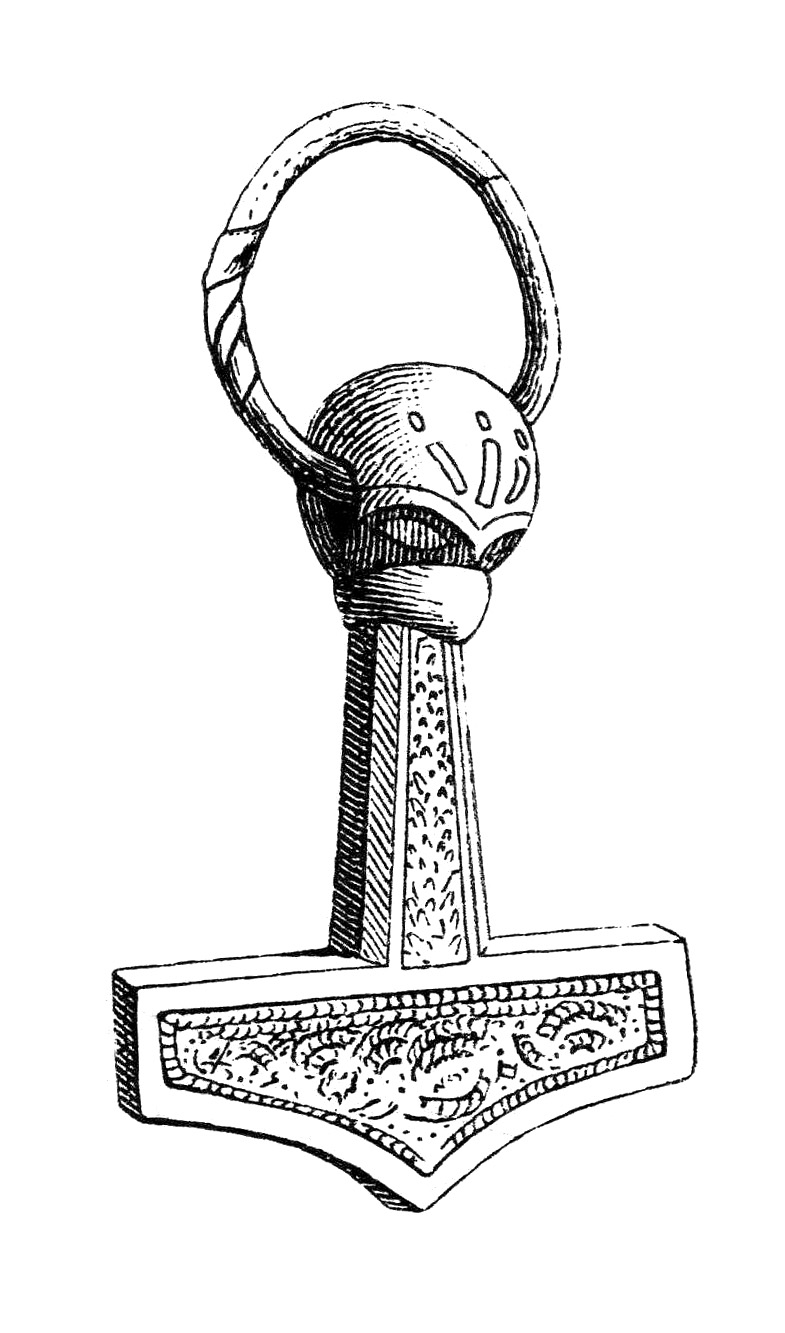
Drawing of Thor's hammer amulet from Mandemark, Møn, Denmark

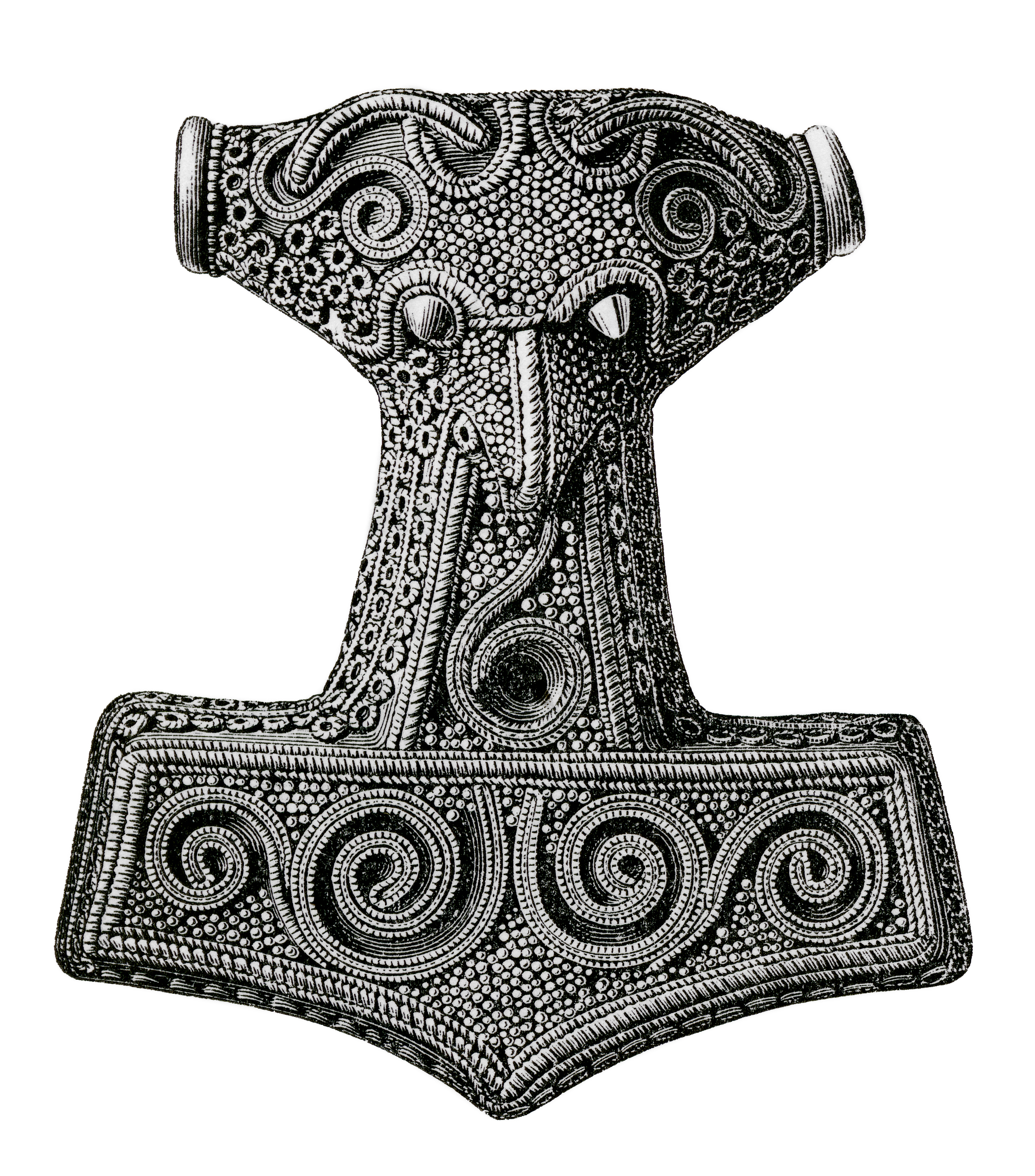
Drawing of a silver-gilted Thor's hammer found in Scania, Sweden

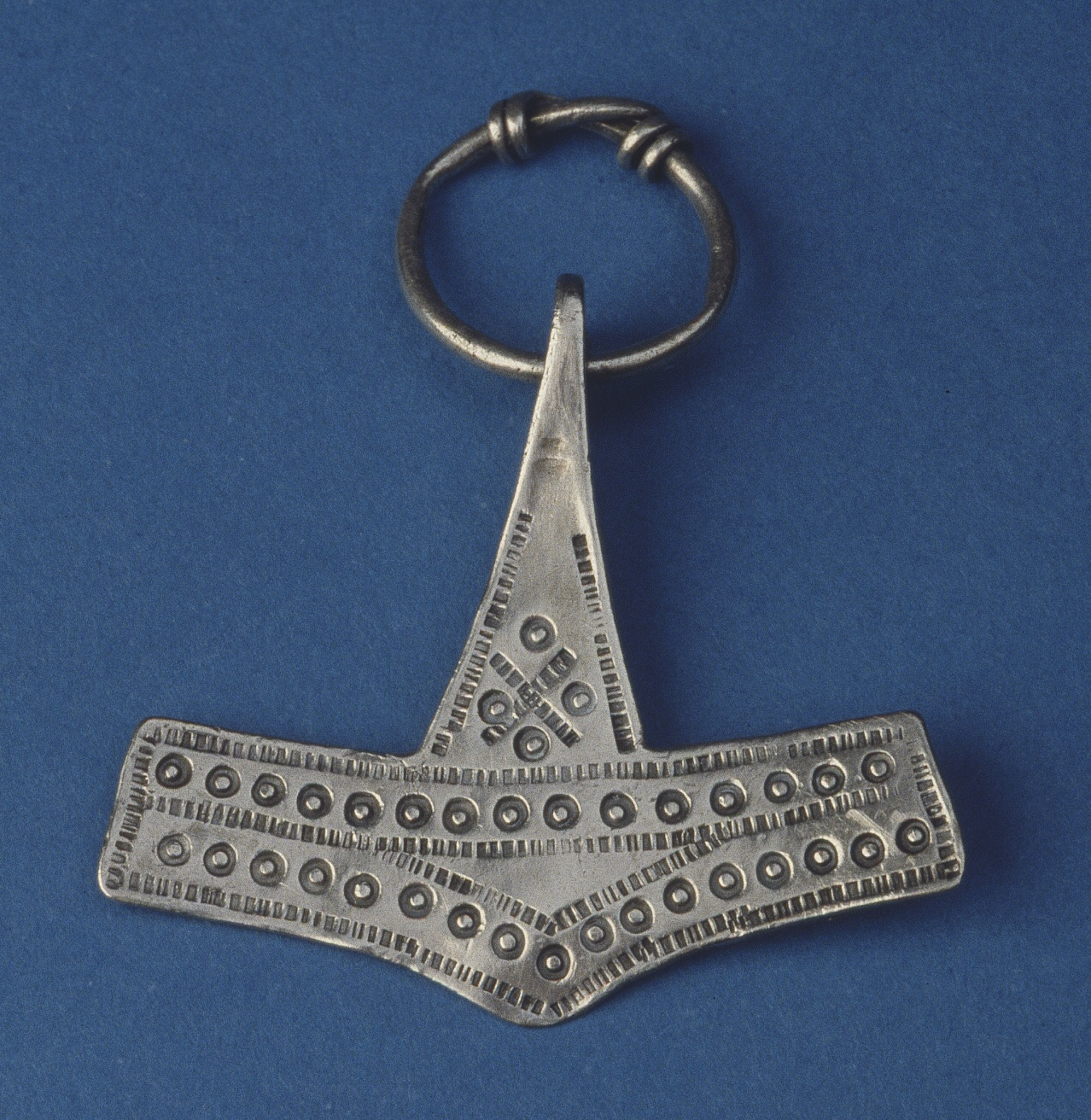
Photograph of a hammer from Rømersdal, Bornholm, Denmark, dated c. 790-1100 CE

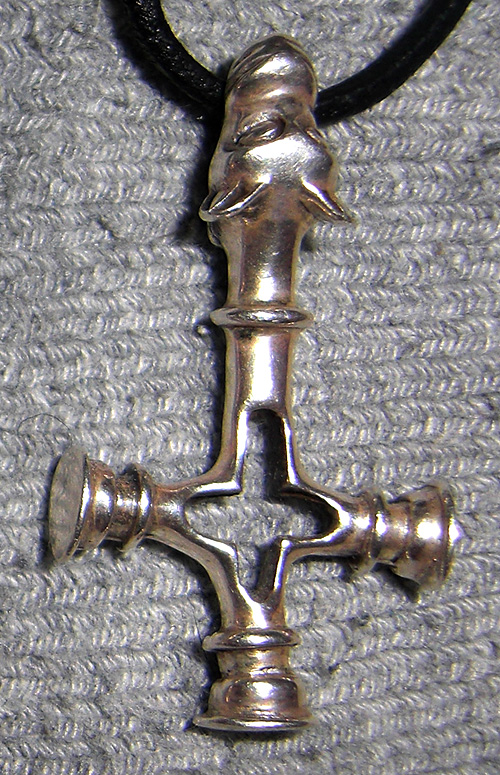
Replica of a silver pendant from the Viking period (c. 11th century) found in Foss, Iceland, sometimes described as "wolf cross" (vargkors). It could be interpreted both as a Christian cross and as a Heathen Thor's hammer (Mjolnir or Mjöllnir).

In Viking Age cremation graves in the Mälaren area, Åland and Russia, there are finds of what archaeologists have named Thor's hammer-rings. These are iron rings with multiple amulets attached; many but not all amulets are shaped like hammers. Found in cinerary urns, in graves for both sexes but more often in women's graves, the amulet rings may have played a role in cremation practices, but their exact function is unknown. The earliest examples are from the Vendel Period but they appear to have become more common in the late Viking Age, which might be connected to political and religious conflicts.

=== Eyrarland Statue ===
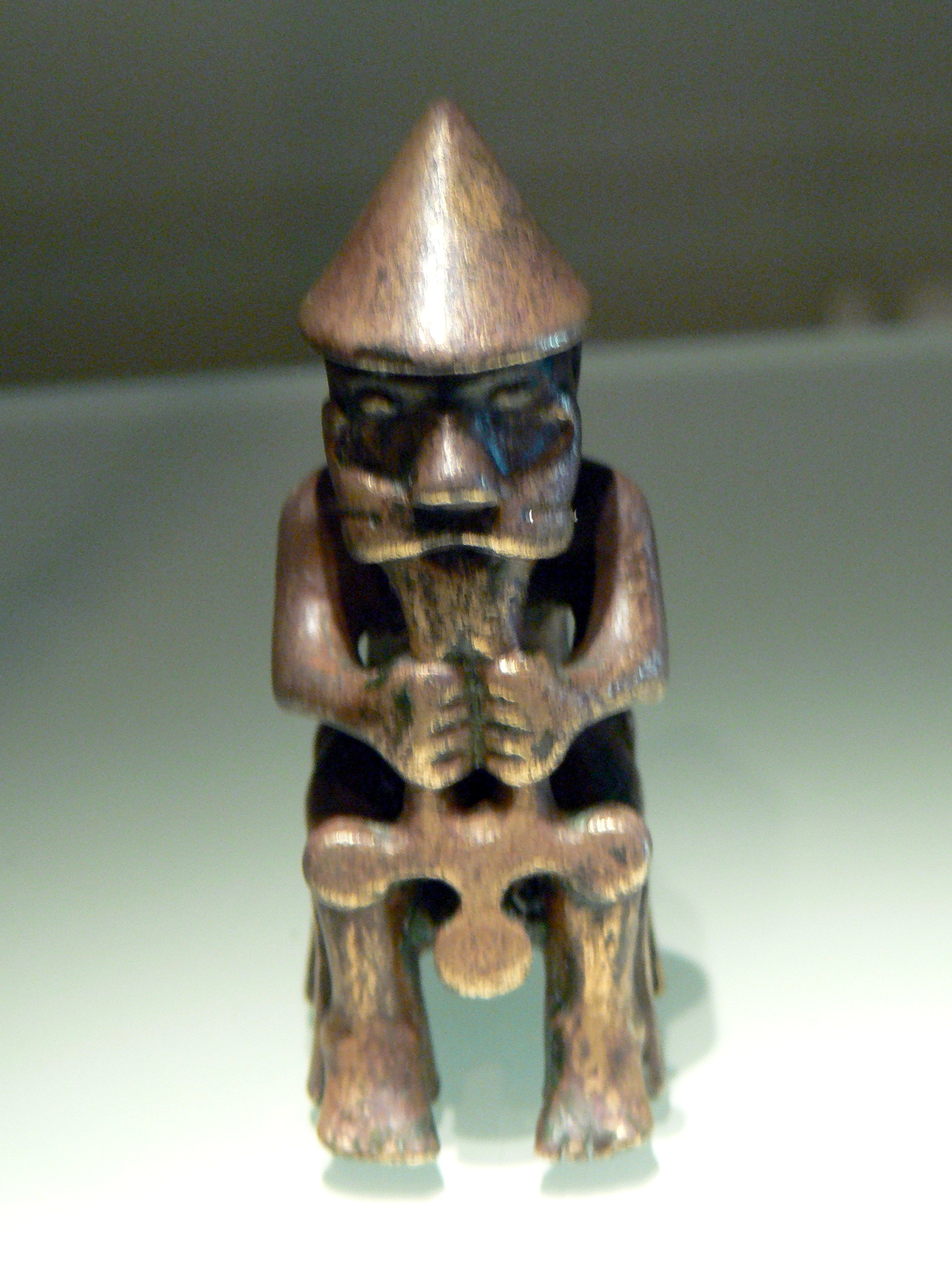
The Eyrarland Statue, a statue of a seated figure from about AD 1000 that was recovered at the Eyrarland farm in the area of Akureyri, Iceland.

The Eyrarland Statue, a copper alloy figure found near Akureyri, Iceland dating from around the 11th century, may depict Thor seated and gripping his hammer.

=== Rune stones and picture stones ===
Pictorial representations of Thor's hammer appear on several runestones, such as DR 26, DR 48 and DR 120 in Denmark and VG 113, Sö 86 and Sö 111 in Sweden. At least three stones depict Thor fishing for the serpent Jörmungandr, and two of them feature hammers: the Altuna Runestone in Altuna, Sweden and the Gosforth depiction in Gosforth, England.

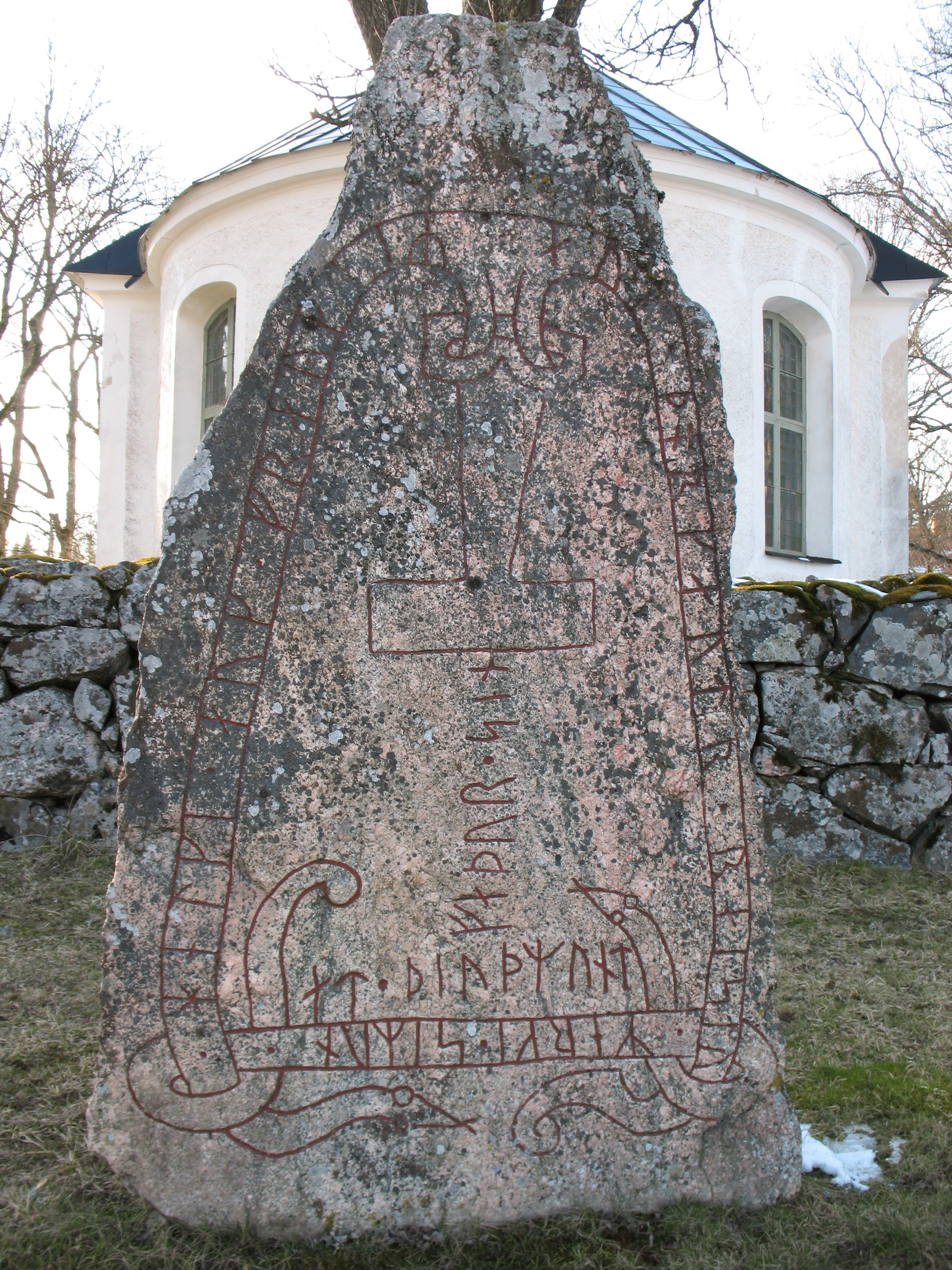
A runestone from Södermanland, Sweden bearing a depiction of Thor's hammer

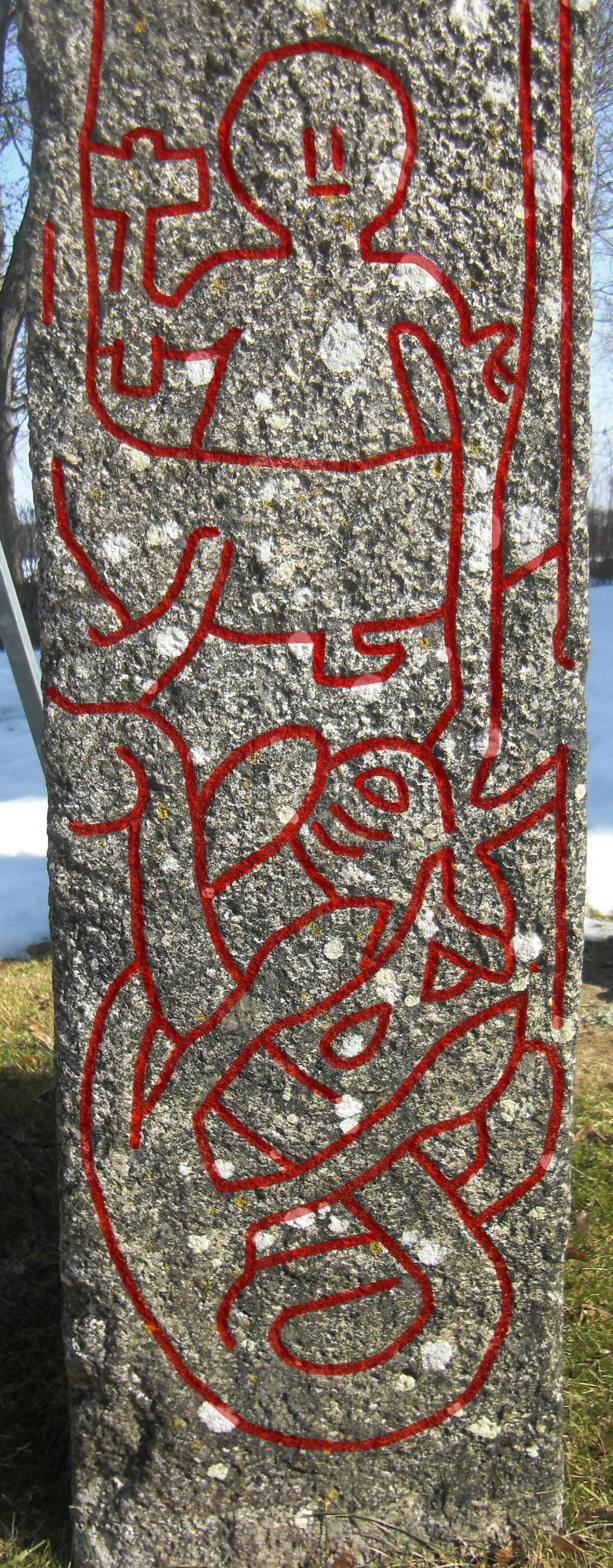
The Altuna stone from Sweden, one of four stones depicting Thor's fishing trip

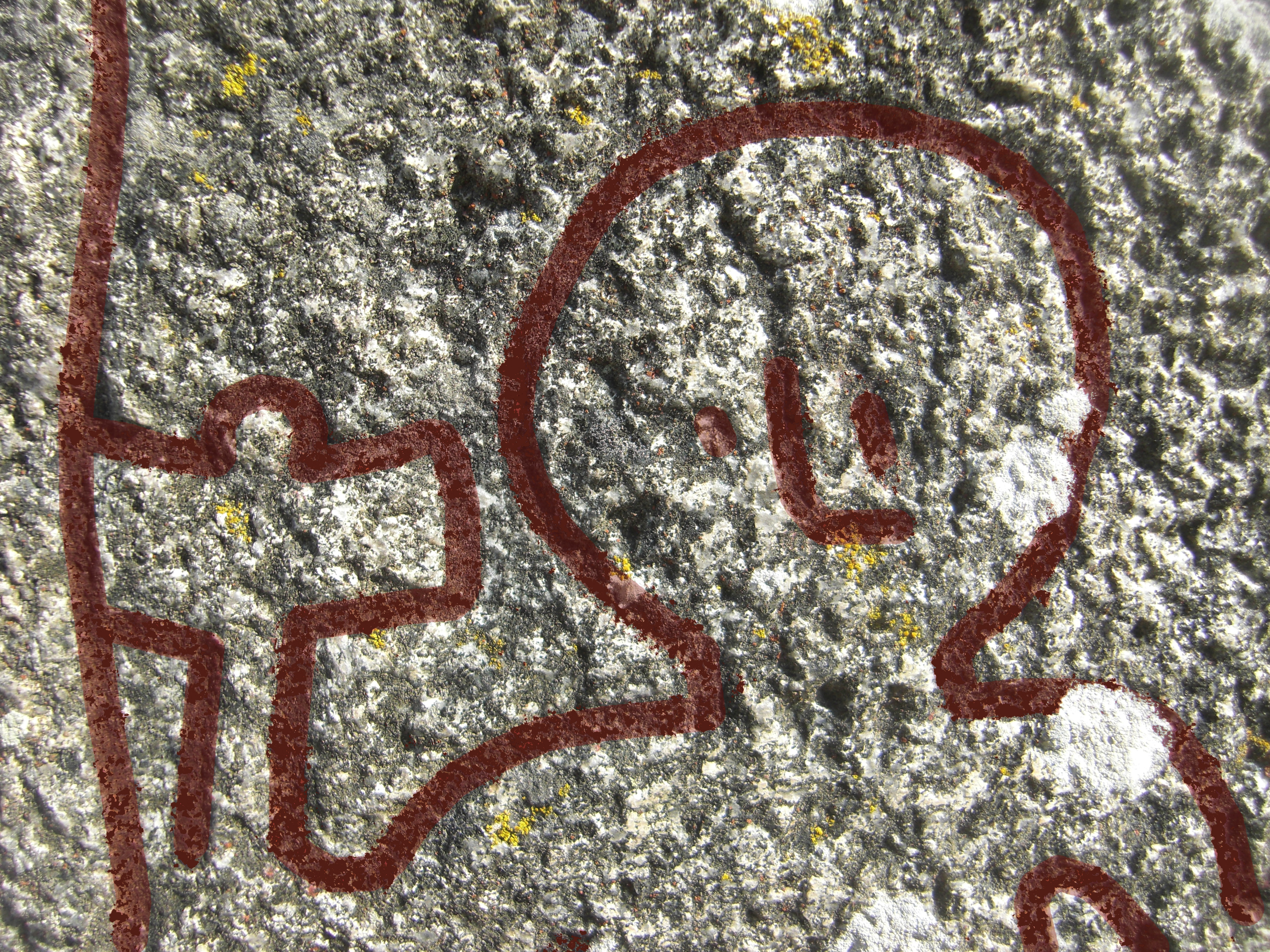
Closeup of Thor with Mjölnir depicted on the Altuna stone.

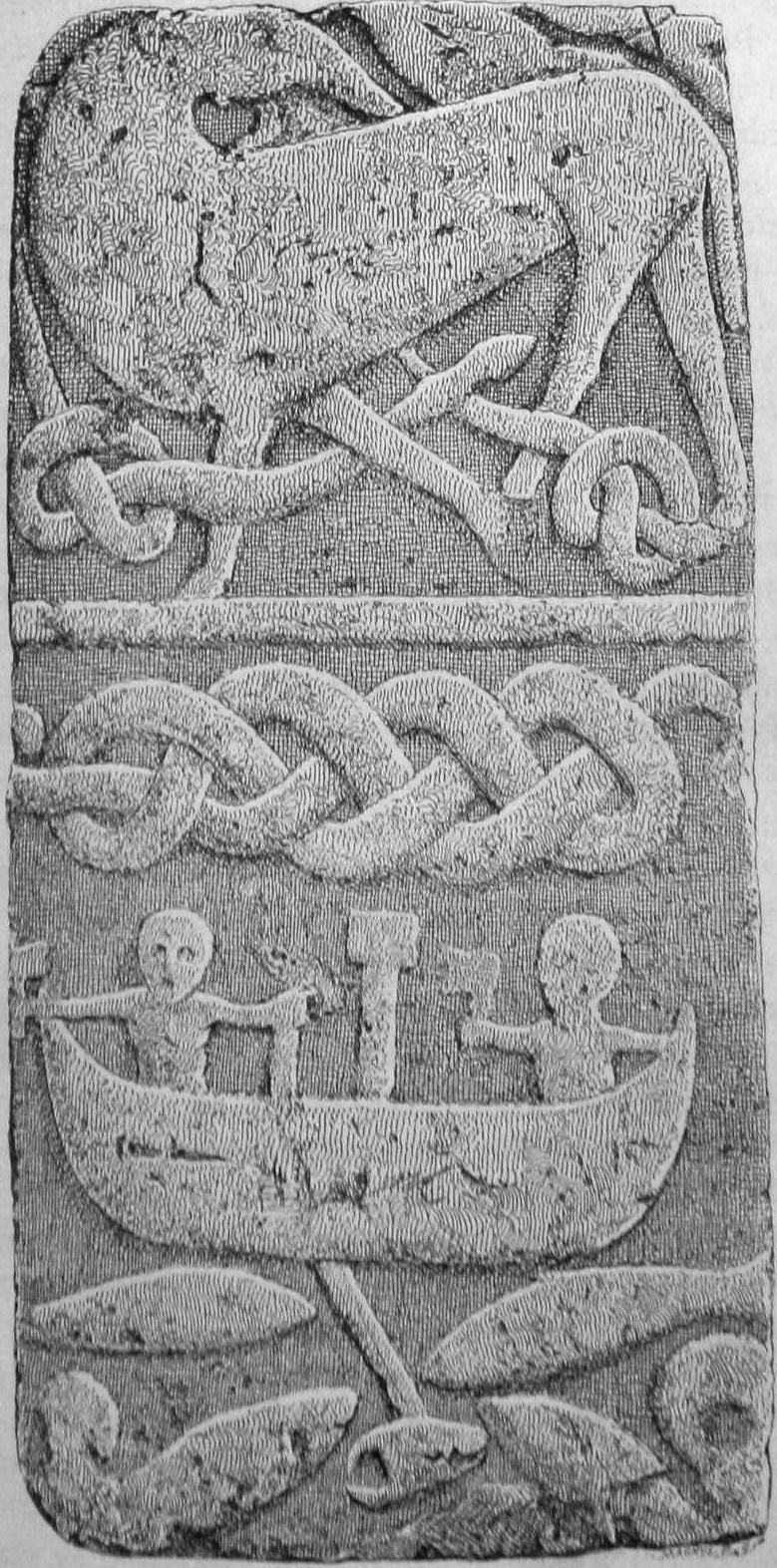
The Gosforth depiction, one of the stones depicting Thor's fishing trip

As Beard notes, Thor "is the only known god to have been called on to bless or hallow runestones from the Viking Age", a fact observed by scholars since at least the 19th century.

== Scholarly reception and interpretation ==
=== Latin sources: Adam of Bremen and Saxo Grammaticus ===
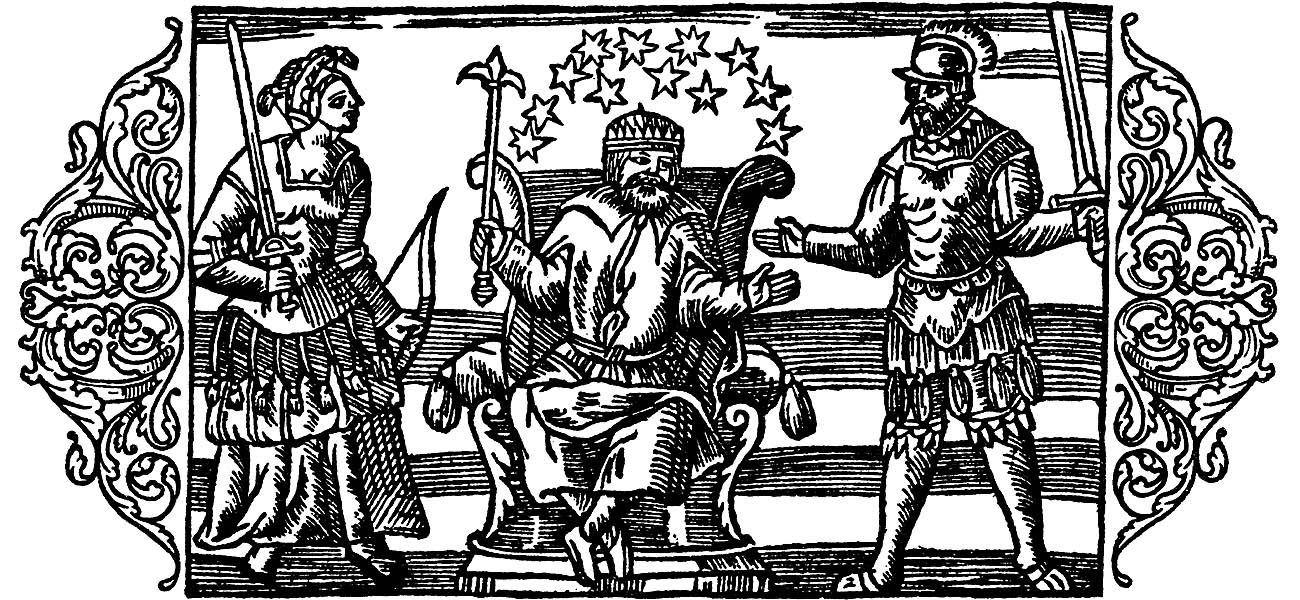
16th-century depiction of Norse gods from Olaus Magnus's A Description of the Northern Peoples; from left to right, Frigg, Thor and Odin

Two sources describe Thor as wielding hammer-like objects, although not described as hammers. In the 11th century, chronicler Adam of Bremen records in his Gesta Hammaburgensis Ecclesiae Pontificum that a statue of Thor, who Adam describes as "mightiest", sits in the Temple at Uppsala in the center of a triple throne (flanked by Woden and "Fricco") located in Gamla Uppsala, Sweden. Adam details that "Thor, they reckon, rules the sky; he governs thunder and lightning, winds and storms, fine weather and fertility" and that "Thor, with his mace, looks like Jupiter". Adam details that the people of Uppsala had appointed priests to each of the gods, and that the priests were to offer up sacrifices. In Thor's case, he continues, these sacrifices were done when plague or famine threatened. Earlier in the same work, Adam relays that in 1030 an English preacher, Wulfred, was lynched by assembled Germanic pagans for "profaning" a representation of Thor.

12th century Danish author Saxo Grammaticus's Gesta Danorum, an euhemerized version of the god depicts him as wielding a clava, a club made from oak. Saxo provides a euhemerized tale about its origins that, like the Skáldskaparmál narrative above, describes the hammer as having a short handle, confirming a broader tradition both of the shortness of the hammer and also its role in narrative as a weapon intended for protecting the gods. This description occurs in book three of Gesta Danorum:

But Thor shattered all their shield-defences with the terrific swings of his club, calling on his enemies to attack him as much as his comrades support him. There was no armour which could stand up to his strokes, nor anyone who could survive them. Shields, helmets, everything he drove at with his oak cudgel was crushed on impact, nor were bodily size or muscle any protection. Consequently victory would have gone to the gods, had not Høther, whose line of men had bent inwards, flown forward and rendered the club useless by lopping off the handle. Immediately they were denied this weapon the deities fled.

Various scholars have considered these weapons to simply be references to Mjölnir. Beard notes that "the archaeological hammer finds (even those contemporary to Adam's account) clearly do not resemble these club-like weapons at all, making it possible that their existence in the literature is more likely a result of interpretatio romana than anything else (although one should remember that the Irish Dagda also uses a club ...). Indeed, there is only a single instance of a hammer made of wood in the entirety of [the Eitri database], and this artifact is a mere half fragment that may not be a hammer at all."

=== Temple instruments and ceremonial significance ===
The Old Norse record mentions Thor using Mjölnir not only as a fearsome weapon but also a means of sanctifying or hallowing. For example, as detailed above, Þrymskviða mentions that the hammer was to be brought in to sanctify the bride (who in fact turns out to be Thor in disguise), in Gylfaginning Thor revives his goats Tanngrisnir and Tanngnjóstr with the hammer, and in Skáldskaparmál Thor uses his hammer to bless Baldr's ship at his and Nana's ship funeral. A variety of items from the archaeological record call upon Thor for healing, some explicitly representing or invoking his hammer. According to Book 13 of Saxo Grammaticus's Gesta Danorum, Magnus the Strong removed large hammer models from a temple dedicated to Thor (here referred to as Jupiter via interpretatio romana) in 1125:

Oliver Elton translation (1894):

He took care to bring home certain hammers of unusual weight, which they call Jupiter's, used by the island men in their unique faith. For the men of old, desiring to comprehend the causes of thunder and lightning by means of the similitude of things, took hammers great and massy of bronze, with which they believed the crashing of the sky might be made, thinking that great and violent noise might very well be imitated by the smith's toil, as it were. But Magnus, in his zeal for Christian teaching and dislike for Paganism, determined to spoil the temple of its equipment, and Jupiter of his tokens in the place of his sanctity. And even now the Swedes consider him guilty of sacrilege and a robber of spoil belonging to the god.

According to Davidson, "it would seem indeed as though the power of the thunder god, symbolized by his hammer, extended all over that had to do with the well-being of the community. It covered birth, marriage, and death, burial, and cremation ceremonies, weapons and feasting, travelling, land-taking, and the making of oath between men. The famous weapon of Thor was not only the symbol of destructive power of the storm, of fire from heaven, but also a protection against the forces of evil and violence."

=== Nordic Bronze Age and potential Proto-Indo-European origins ===
Nordic Bronze Age petroglyphs depict figures holding hammers and hammer-like weapons, such as axes. Some scholars have proposed these to depict precursors to Mjölnir. As scholar Rudolf Simek summarizes, "as the Bronze Age rock carvings of axe or hammer-bearing god-like figures show, [Mjölnir] played a role as a consecratory instrument early on, probably in a fertility cult ... ".

Thor is one of various deities associated with or personifying thunder who wields a hammer-like object associated with phenomena such as lightning or fire in a variety of myth bodies. In some cases these hammer-like objects return to the deity when thrown or result in changes in weather. Examples frequently cited by scholars include Vedic Indra, who wields a lightning spear; Jupiter, who throws lightning bolts; and the Celtic deity Dagda, who carries a club. Numerous scholars have identified the concept of Thor and his hammer, like Indra, Zeus, and the Dagda, as stemming from Proto-Indo-European mythology.

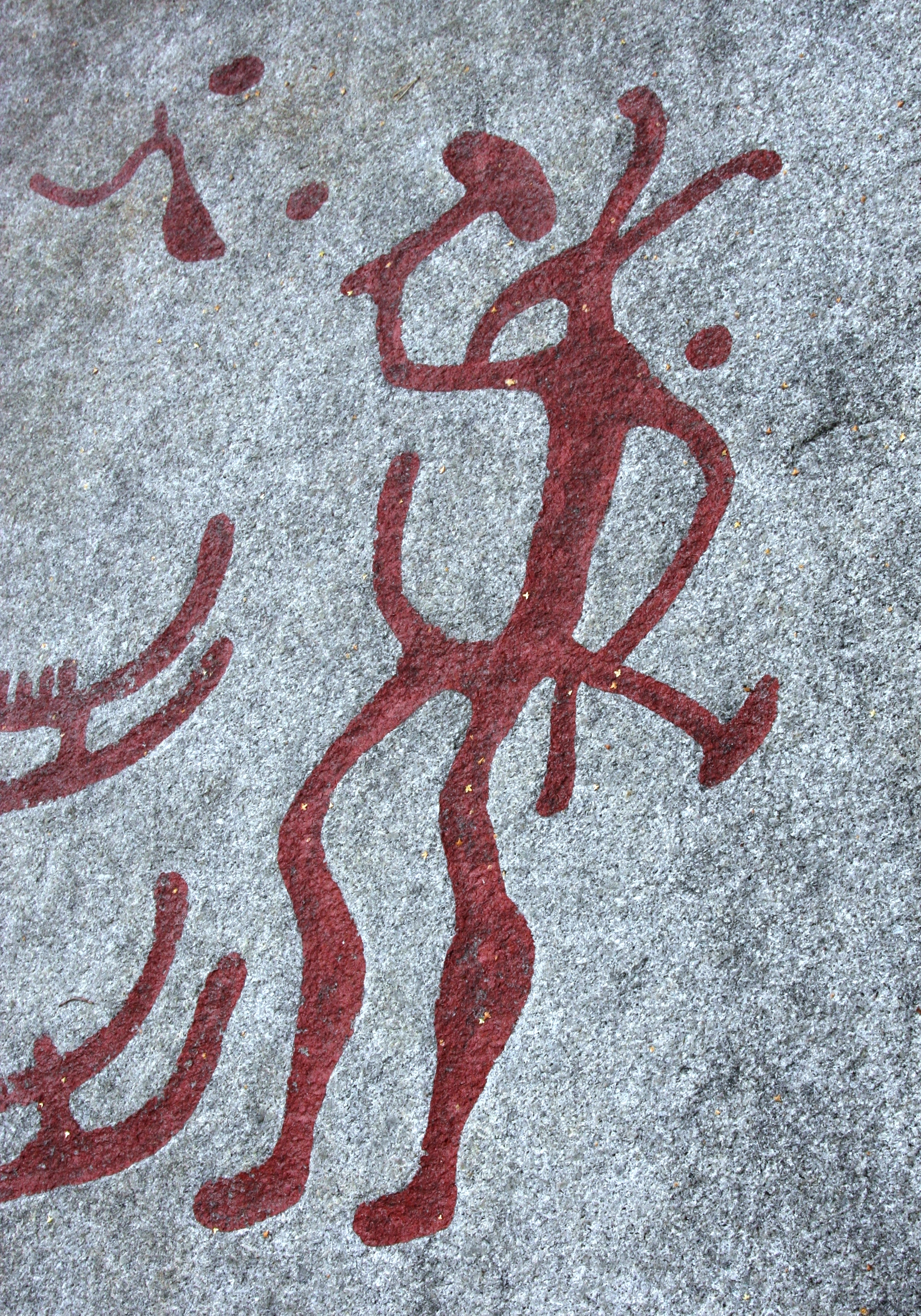
Nordic Bronze Age petroglyph featuring a figure holding a hammer-like object among the Tanum rock carvings, Sweden

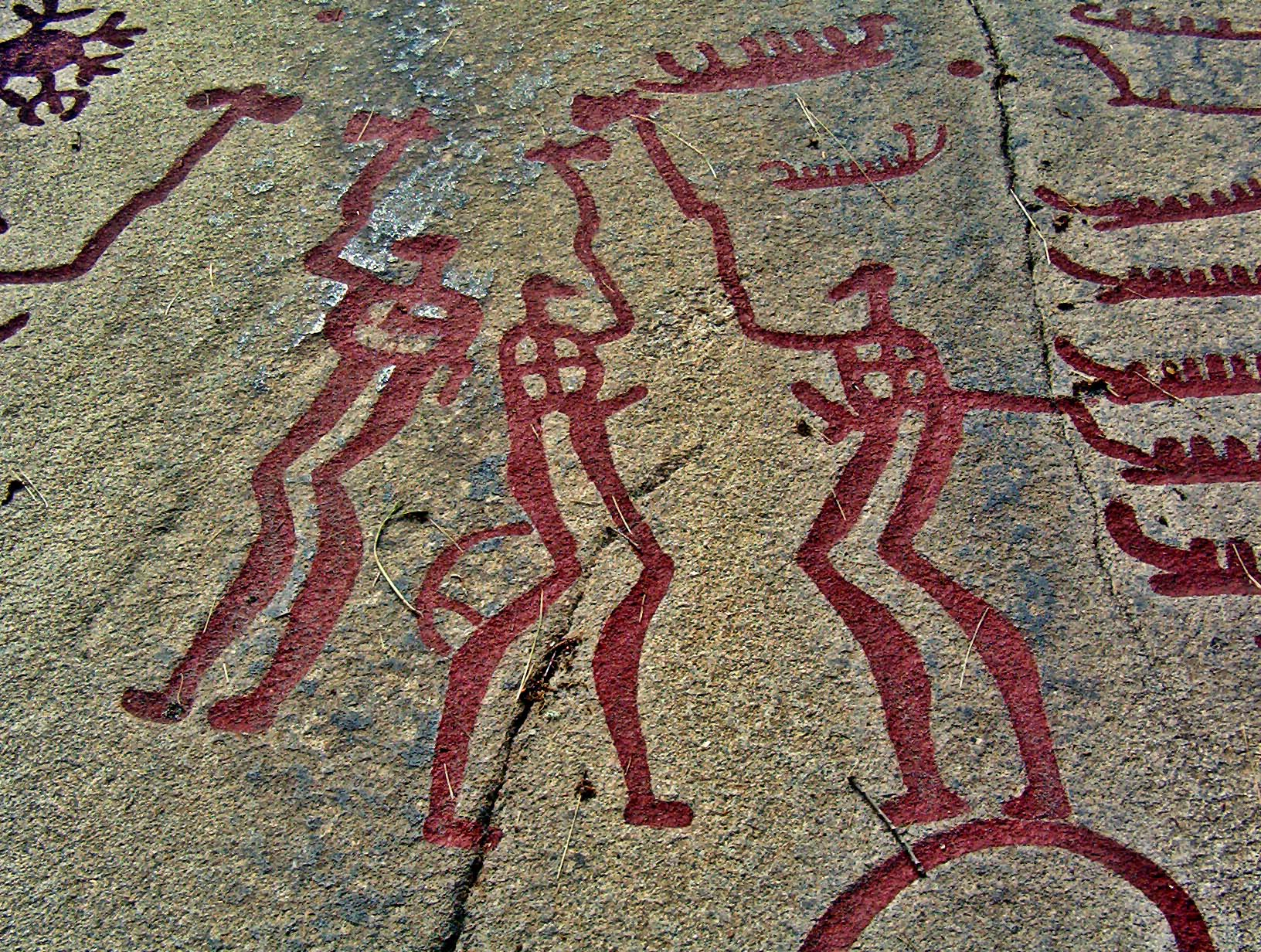
Nordic Bronze Age petroglyph featuring figures holding hammers or axe-like objects among the Tanum rock carvings, Sweden

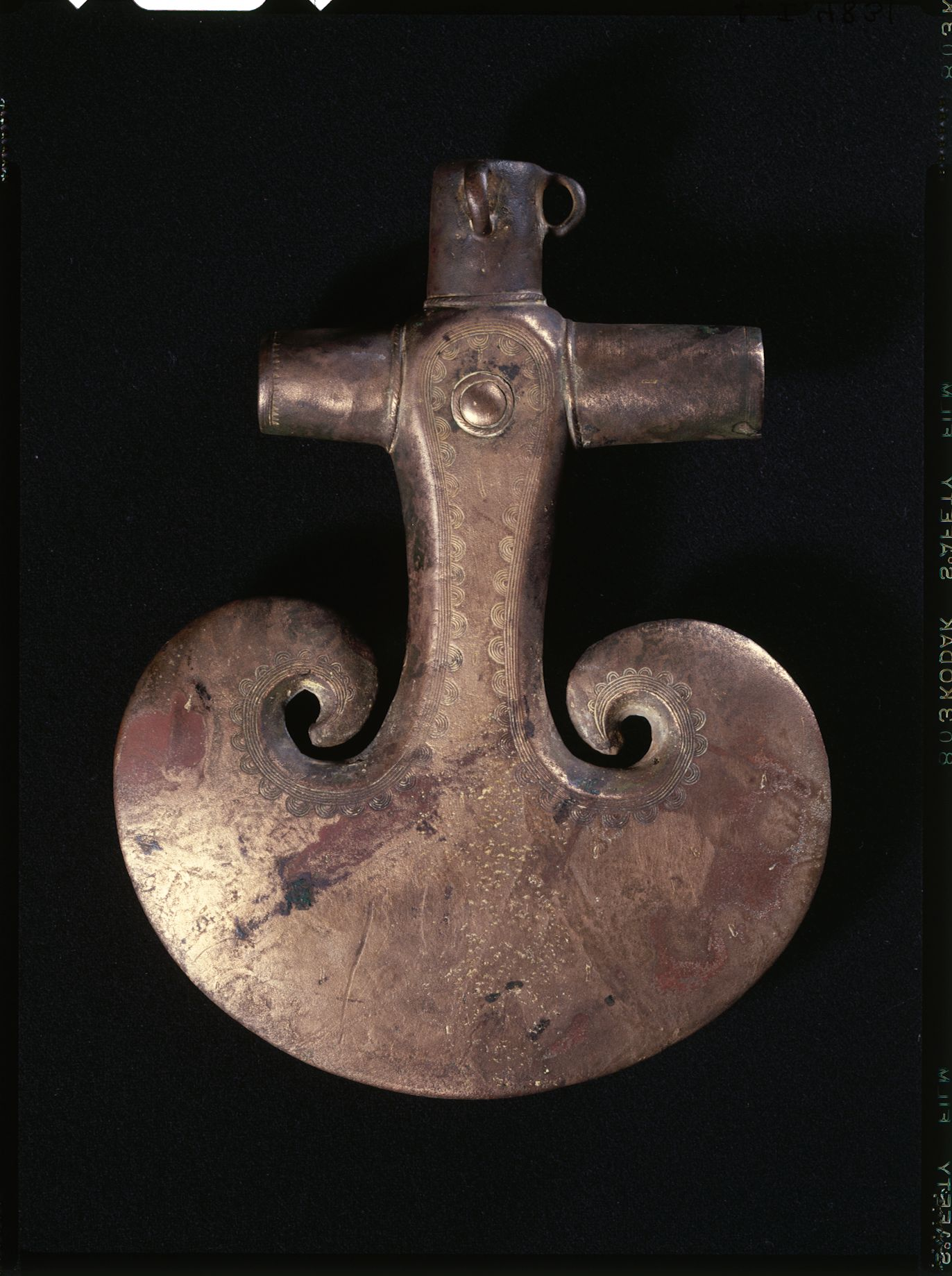
Nordic Bronze Age ceremonial axe, blade edge pointed down.

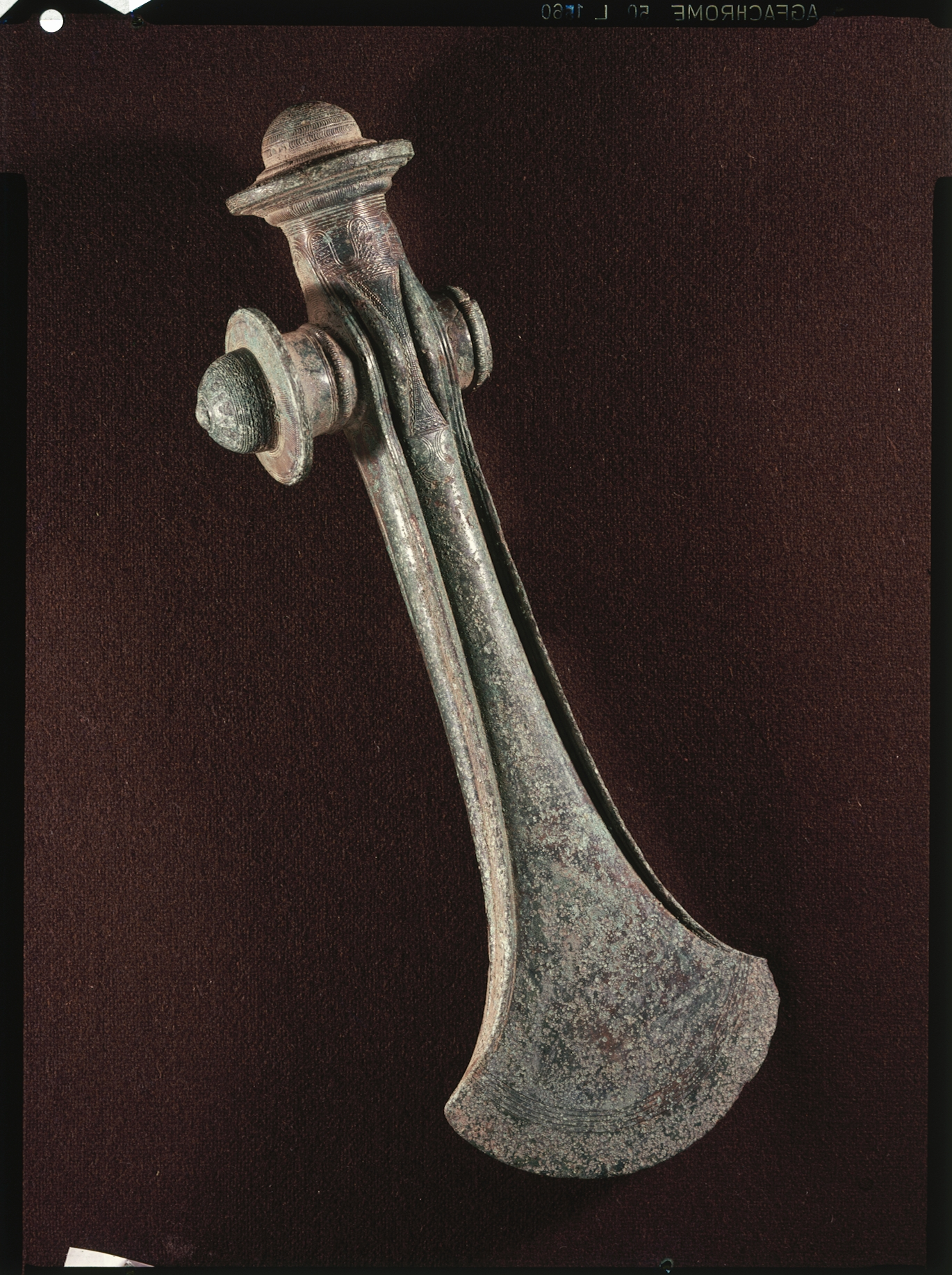
Nordic Bronze Age ceremonial axe, blade pointed down.

=== Relationship to the swastika and Icelandic folk belief ===
The swastika appears on a variety of objects produced or used by the ancient Germanic peoples. In late Icelandic folk belief, Icelandic grimoires list the swastika symbol as 'Thor's hammer'. According to runologists Mindy MacLeod and Bernard Mees, "By early modern times, the description 'Thor's hammer' had come to be applied to swastikas ('sun-wheels'), not the hammer symbols seen in medieval runic inscriptions. Similarly, terms once used for other symbols had also come to be associated with new forms, often of unclear origin." Other scholars have proposed that the swastika represented Thor's hammer among the ancient Germanic peoples from an early date. English folklorist Hilda Ellis Davidson surveys the swastika's use in the ancient archaeological Germanic record (up to 1964) and concludes that "Thor was the sender of lightning and the god who dealt out both sunshine and rain to men, and it seems likely the swastika as well as the hammer sign was connected with him."

== Modern popular culture ==
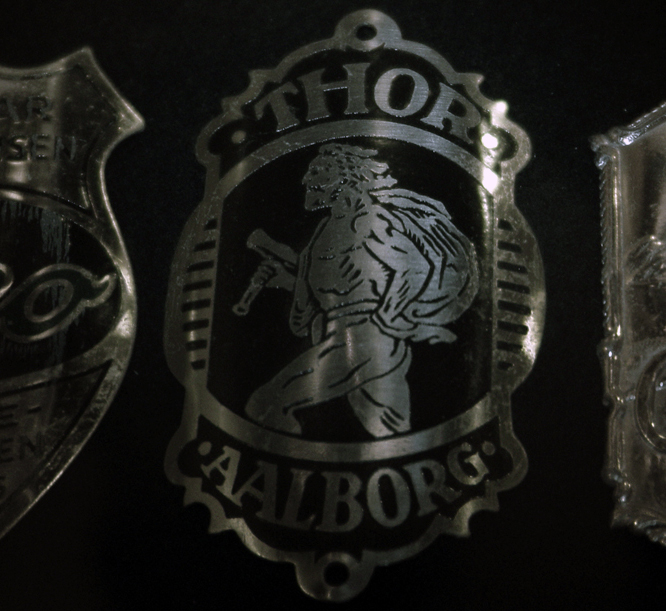
An early 20th century Danish bicycle head badge depicting Thor holding the hammer Mjölnir

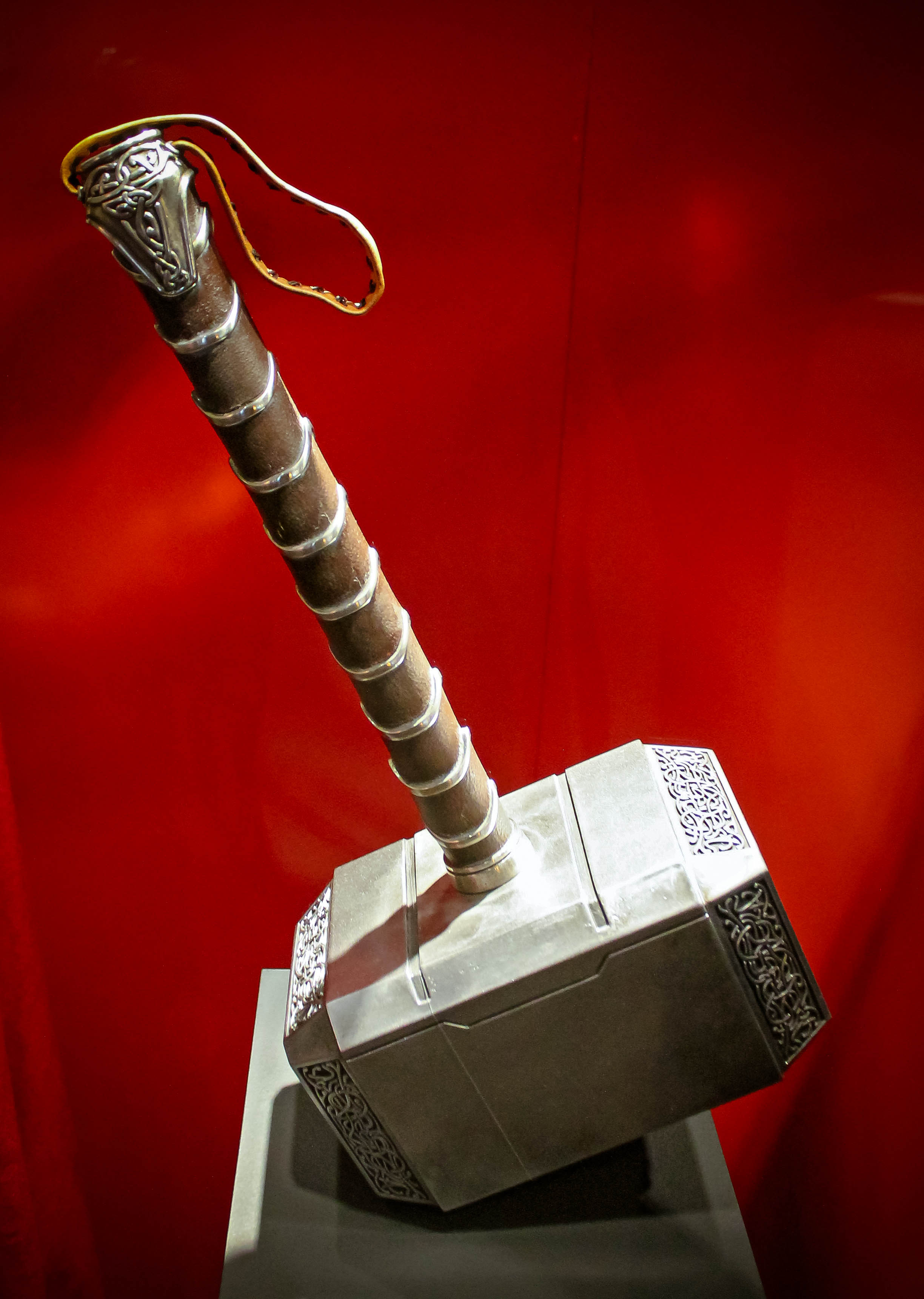
Marvel Comics' depiction of Mjölnir, wielded by Thor Odinson

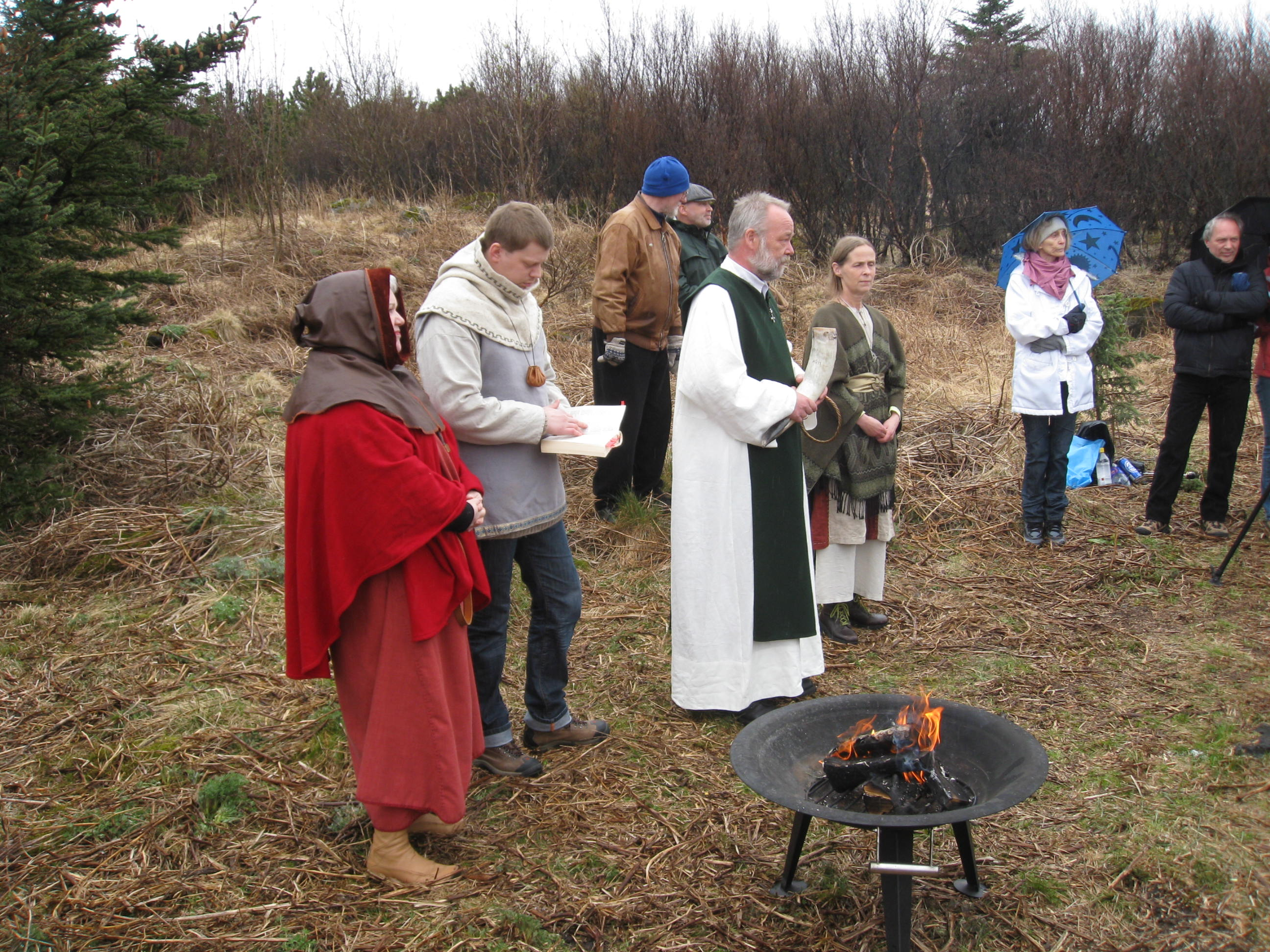
In this 2009 gathering by Icelandic heathen group Ásatrúarfélagið, allsherjargoði Hilmar Örn Hilmarsson wears a reproduction of a historic hammer pendant discovered in Foss, Iceland

Mjölnir is depicted in a variety of media in the modern era. As noted by Rudolf Simek, in art "Thor is almost always depicted with [Mjölnir]", but how the hammer appears varies: at times it may appear as hammer-like versions of the club of Hercules or as a large sledge hammer, sometimes displaying influences taken from the archaeological record. Examples include Henry Fuseli's 1780 painting Thor Battering the Midgard Serpent; H. E. Freund's 1821–1822 statue Thor; B. E. Fogelberg's 1844 marble statue Thor; Mårten Eskil Winge's 1872 painting Thor's Fight with the Giants; K. Ehrenberg's 1883 drawing Odin, Thor und Magni; several illustrations by E. Doepler published in Wilhelm Ranisch's 1901 Walhall (Thor; Thor und die Midgardschlange; Thor den Hrungnir bekämpfend; Thor bei dem Riesen Þrym als Braut verkleidet; Thor bei Hymir; Thor bei Skrymir; Thor den Fluß Wimur durchwatend); J. C. Dollman's 1909 drawings Thor and the Mountain and Sif and Thor; G. Poppe's painting Thor; E. Pottner's 1914 drawing Thors Schatten; H. Natter's marble statue Thor; and U. Brember's 1977 illustrations to Die Heimholung des Hammers by H. C. Artmann.

A variety of locations, organizations, and objects are named after the hammer. Examples include Mjølnerparken in Copenhagen, Denmark; the Mjølnir crater, a meteorite crater off the coast of Norway; the Hammer of Thor monument in Quebec, Canada; the Thor's Hammer rollercoaster in the Tusenfryd theme park in Norway; the Norwegian football club FK Mjølner; and a variety of ship names, including the HNoMS Mjølner (1868) and several ships by the name of HSwMS Mjölner. Musical projects who take their name from that of the hammer include American-Norwegian metal band Thorr's Hammer and Icelandic rock band Thor's Hammer. Tórshavn Municipality, the capital city of the Faroe Islands, features a depiction of Mjölner on its seal and coat of arms, as does the Torsås Municipality in Sweden.

In the modern era, Mjölnir pendants are worn by a variety of people and for a variety of purposes. For example, the symbol is commonly used by adherents of Heathenry, a new religious movement. Writing in 2006, scholars Jenny Blain and Robert J. Wallis observe that "the most common of heathen sacred artefacts is Thor's hammer" and add that "heathen spirituality is expressed visually and publicly in a number of ways, such as the display of reproduced artefacts (for example, Thor's hammer as a pendant … ), pilgrimages to sacred sites (and votive offerings left there), and 'visits' to museum collection displays of artefacts which offer direct visual (and other resonant) links to ancient religions."

United States Department of Veterans Affairs headstone emblem 55

In the United States, Thor's Hammer is offered as a religious emblem (#55, "Hammer of Thor") for military veteran grave stones produced by the United States National Cemetery Administration.

The symbol has seen some use in white nationalist and neo-Nazi circles. As noted by the Anti-Defamation League symbol database entry for "Thor's Hammer", "Although its traditional origins are non-racist, and although most Asatruers today are not racist, the Thor's Hammer symbol has been appropriated by neo-Nazis and other white supremacists, especially those who practice racist or white supremacist versions of neo-Norse beliefs under the guise of Odinism or Wotanism. White supremacists will often even create racist versions of the Thor's Hammer, incorporating swastikas or other hate symbols into the decoration." Scholar Katherine Beard notes that "most people who wear hammer pendants today do so for cultural, religious, or decorative reasons and maintain absolutely no ties to any racist groups or beliefs".

== See also ==
- Hiddensee treasure
- Uchide no kozuchi
- Ukonvasara
