= Járngreipr =

Relics in Norse mythology

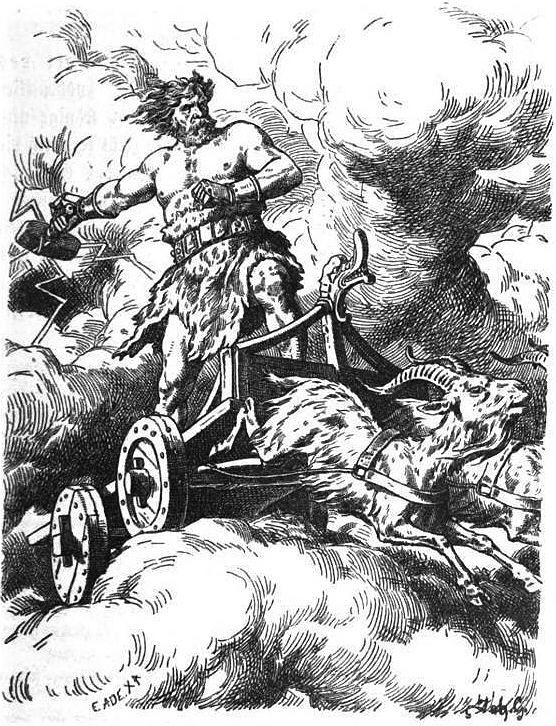
"Thor" (1901) by Johannes Gehrts.

In Norse mythology, Járngreipr (Old Norse: [ˈjɑːrnˌɡrɛipz̠], "iron grippers") or Járnglófar ([ˈjɑːrnˌɡloːvɑz̠], "iron gauntlets") are the iron gloves of the god Thor. According to the Prose Edda, along with the hammer Mjölnir and the belt Megingjörð, Járngreipr is one of Thor's three crucial possessions. According to chapter 20 of the book Gylfaginning, he requires the gloves to handle his powerful hammer. The reason for this may come from the forging of the hammer, when the dwarf working the bellows was bitten in his eye by a gadfly (commonly held to be Loki in disguise) which caused the handle of the hammer to be shortened. Another theory is that the iron gauntlets are required to handle the force with which the hammer flies back to Thor or the power it generates when he swings and uses its magic.
