= HSwMS Mjölner =

Several ships of the Swedish Navy have been named HSwMS Mjölner, named after Mjölnir, the hammer of Thor in Norse mythology:

- HSwMS Mjölner (32) was a Mode-class destroyer launched in 1942 and decommissioned in 1966
- HSwMS Mjölner (P157) was a Hugin-class patrol boat launched in 1978 and decommissioned in 1995
