= Ukonvasara =

Finnish mythological weapon

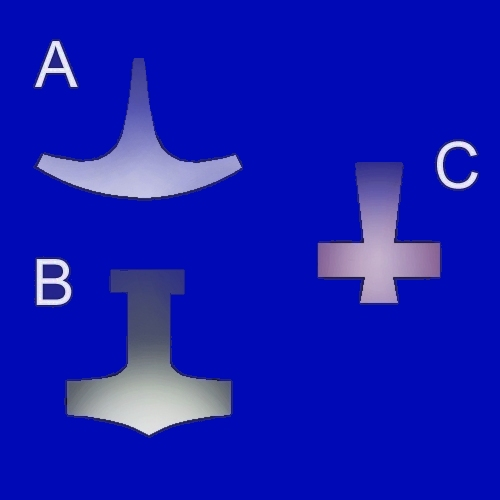
Hammer-shaped pendants were carried as protection from the thunder god. A=Finnish Ukonvasara B=Scandinavian Thor's hammer C=Icelandic Thor's hammer

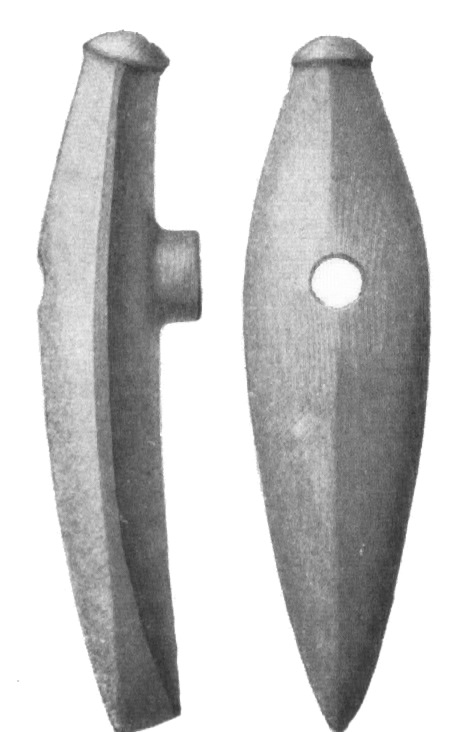
Boat-shaped stone axe/hammer of the Corded Ware culture

Ukonvasara, or Ukonkirves, is the symbol and magical weapon of the Finnish thunder god Ukko, similar to Thor's Mjölnir. Ukonvasara means 'hammer of Ukko'; similarly, Ukonkirves means 'axe of Ukko'. It was said that Ukko created lightning with Ukonvasara.

Ukko's hammer was probably originally a boat-shaped stone axe. When stone tools were abandoned with the advent of metalworking, the origins of stone weapons became a mystery. Stone axes, so-called thunderstones (ukonvaaja in Finnish), were found in the ground, especially after drenching rains washed away dirt. They were believed to be weapons of Ukko, stone heads of the striking lightning. Shamans collected and held stone-axes because they were believed to hold the power to both heal and damage. The same belief existed in Scandinavia for Thor, called "Thor's wedge" (Swedish: torsvigg).

== Etymology ==
According to Asko Parpola, the Proto-West-Uralic *vaśara, originally referred to the axe or mace of the Sejma-Turbino warriors, but later, under Nordic influence, gained the meaning "hammer" from Thor's hammer. The Proto-West-Uralic *vaśara, is an early loanword from the Proto-Indo-Aryan *vaj’ra- but not from Proto-Iranian, because its palatalized sibilant is not consistent with the depalatalization which occurred in Proto-Iranian. The related Sanskrit vajra- and its Avestan cognate vazra- are possibly derived from the Proto-Indo-European root *weg'- which means "to be(come) powerful", state Parpola and Carpelan.

== Indo-European influence ==
Unto Salo believes that Ilmari, another Finnic sky god, is the origin of Ukko, but that as Ukko Ilmari experienced very significant, although far from total, influence from the Indo-European sky god especially in the form of Thor. Others believe that Ukko's original name was Baltic Perkūnas.

Perkūnas is pictured as middle-aged, armed with an axe and arrows, riding a two-wheeled chariot harnessed with goats, like Thor. The name Thor descends from the Proto-Germanic theonym *Þun(a)raz ('Thunder'). According to scholar Peter Jackson, those theonyms may have originally emerged as the result of the fossilization of an original epithet (or epiclesis) of the Proto-Indo-European thunder-god *Perk^{w}unos. from which Perkunas also descended from

Indra is described as using the vajra to kill sinners and ignorant persons. Indra's mythology parallels Perun, Perkūnas, Taranis, and Thor, suggesting a common origin in Proto-Indo-European mythology.

== See also ==
- Mjölnir
- Vajra

== Sources ==
- Delamarre, Xavier (2003). Dictionnaire de la langue gauloise: Une approche linguistique du vieux-celtique continental. Errance. ISBN 9782877723695.
- Orel, Vladimir E. (2003). A Handbook of Germanic Etymology. Brill. ISBN 978-90-04-12875-0.
- Parpola, Asko; Carpelan, Christian (2005). Edwin Francis Bryant; Laurie L. Patton (eds.). The Indo-Aryan Controversy: Evidence and Inference in Indian History. Routledge. ISBN 978-0-7007-1463-6.
- Parpola, Asko (2015). The Roots of Hinduism: The Early Aryans and the Indus Civilization. Oxford University Press. ISBN 978-0-19-022691-6.
