= Megingjörð =

Thors strength belt

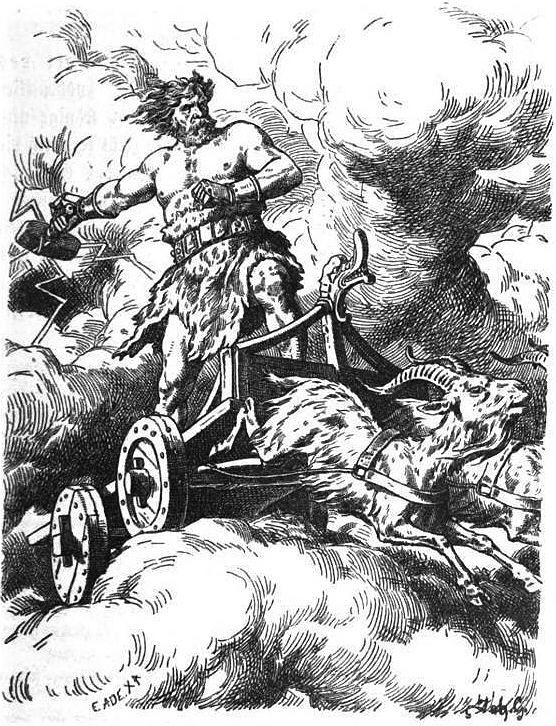
"Thor" (1901) by Johannes Gehrts.

In Norse mythology, the megingjörð (Old Norse: megingjǫrð [ˈmeɣenˌɡjɔrð], meaning "power-belt") is a belt worn by the god Thor. The Old Norse name megin means power or strength, and gjörð means belt.

According to the Prose Edda, the belt is one of Thor's three main possessions, along with the hammer Mjölnir and the iron gloves Járngreipr. When worn, the belt is described as doubling Thor's already prodigious strength.

In verse seven of the skaldic poem Þórsdrápa (Thorsdrapa, Lay of Thor) written by the 10th-century poet Eilífr Goðrúnarson, in the service of Jarl Hákon Sigurðarson, refers to Thor's power-belt.

Harðvaxnar sér herðir
halllands of sik falla
(gatat maðr) njótr (hin neytri)
njarð- (ráð fyrir sér) gjarðar.
Þverrir lætr nema þyrri
Þorns barna sér Mǫrnar
snerriblóð til svíra
salþaks megin vaxa.

The line "njótr njarðgjarðar" literally means "he who benefits from the mighty belt", referring to Thor's magical belt/girdle of strength/power, Megingjörð.

In Gylfaginning, which is the first part of Snorri Sturluson's Prose Edda, after Prologue, verse 45 refers to Thor's power-belt.

En er kom at dagan, þá gekk Þórr út ok sér mann, hvar lá skammt frá honum í skóginum, ok var sá eigi lítill. Hann svaf ok hraut sterkliga. Þá þóttist Þórr skilja, hvat látum verit hafði of nóttina. Hann spennir sik megingjörðum, ok óx honum ásmegin. Ok í því bili vaknar sá maðr ok stóð skjótt upp, en þá er sagt, at Þór varð bilt einu sinni at slá hann með hamrinum ok spurði hann at nafni.

The line "Hann spennir sik megingjörðum, ok óx honum ásmegin" means "He girded himself with his belt of strength, and his divine strength grew" ("He" being Thor).
