= Vajra =

Spiritual weapon or symbol in Dharmic religions

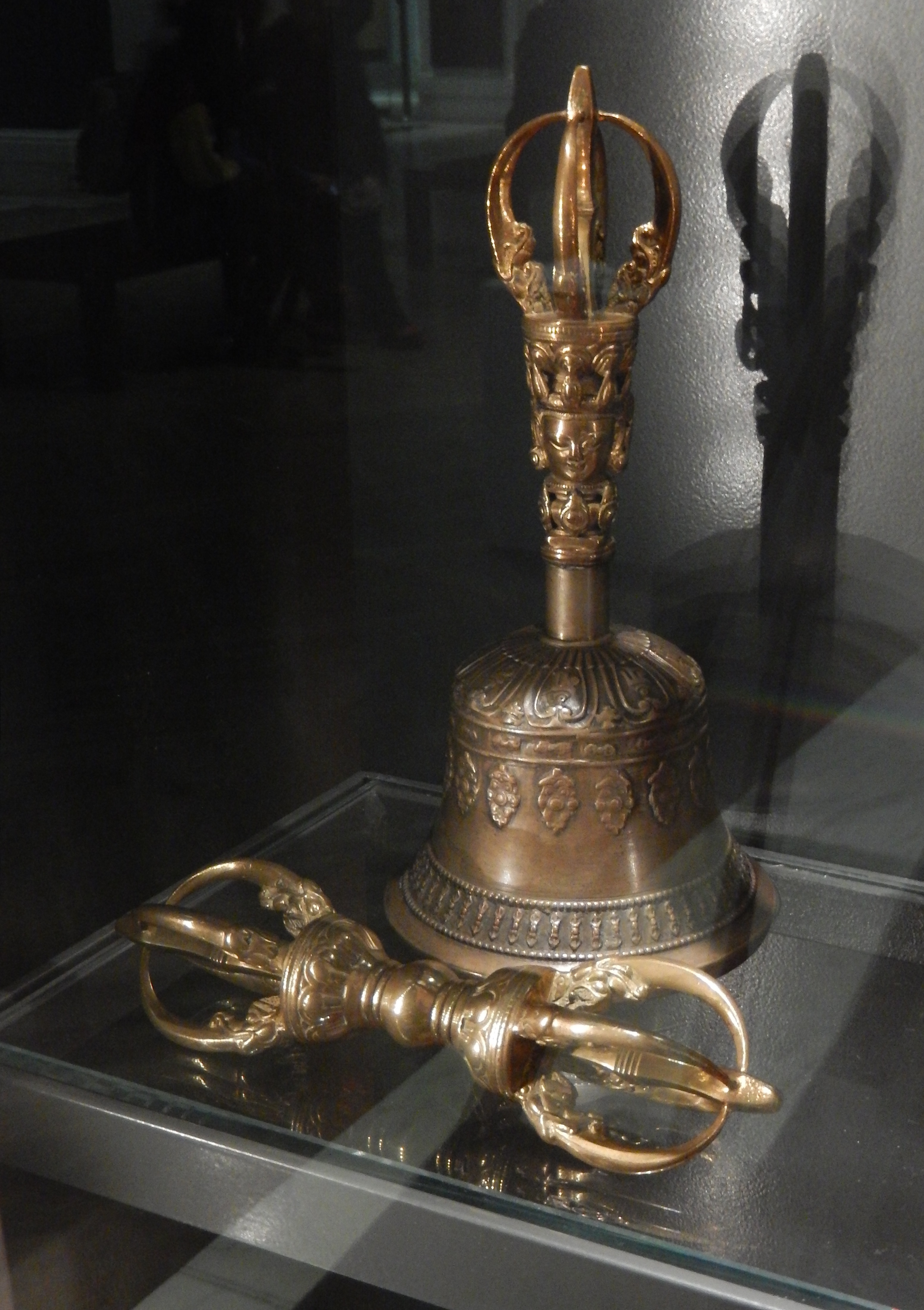
A Tibetan bell and dorje (vajra) are inseparable ritual tools.

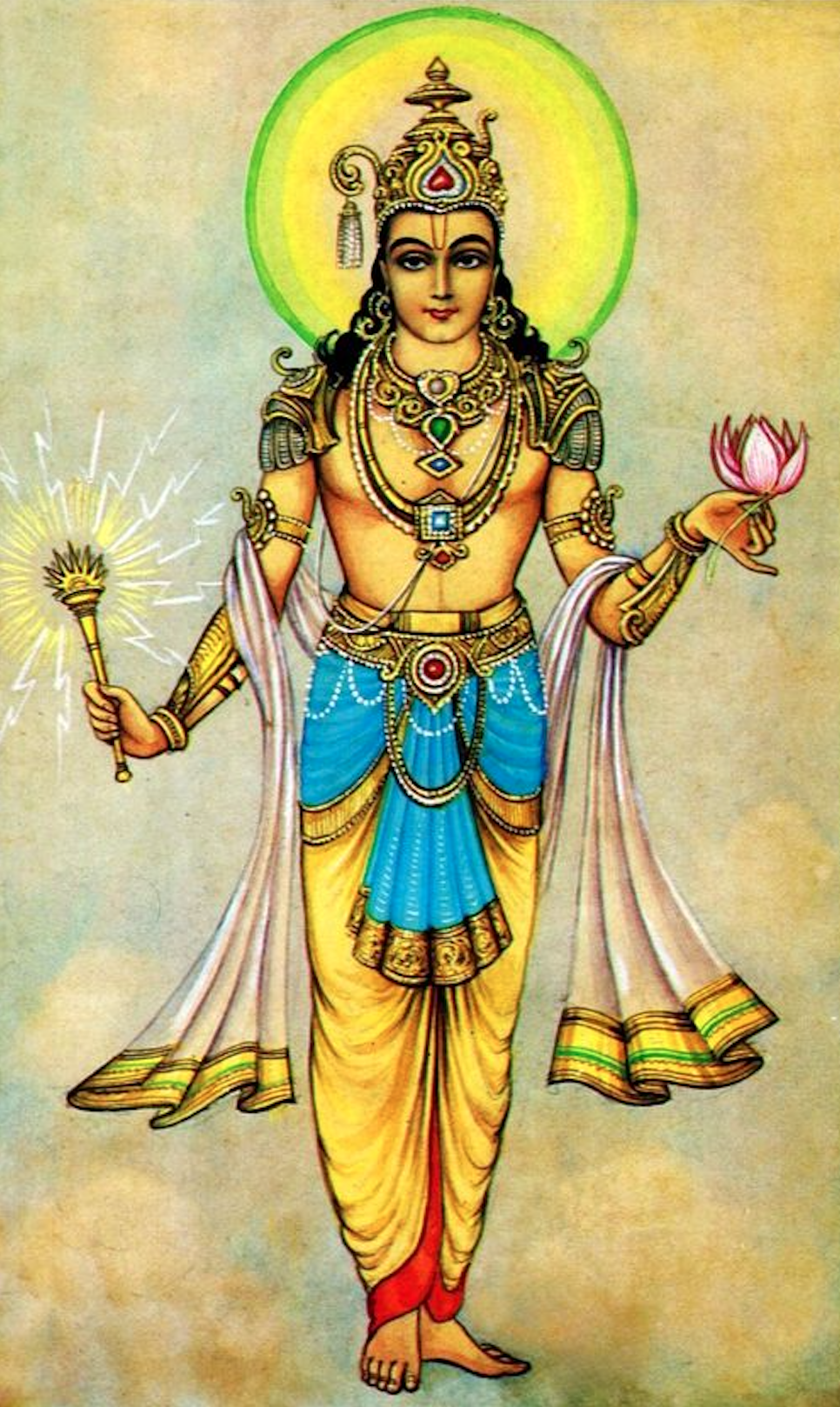
Indra bearing a lotus and Vedic form of a Vajra

A double vajra appears in the national emblem of Bhutan.

The vajra (Sanskrit: वज्र, lit. 'thunderbolt', IAST: vajra, Standard Tibetan: dorje) is a legendary and ritualistic tool, symbolizing the properties of a diamond (indestructibility) and a thunderbolt (irresistible force). It is also described as a "ritual weapon". It is used symbolically by the dharmic traditions of Hinduism, Buddhism, and Jainism, often to represent firmness of spirit and spiritual power. The use of a bell and vajra together as symbolic and ritual tools is found in all schools of Tibetan Buddhism.

Physically, the vajra consists of a round, symmetrical metal scepter with two ribbed spherical heads. The ribs may meet in a ball-shaped top, or they may be separate and end in sharp points. The vajra is considered inseparable from the bell, and both are sold in dharma stores only in matching sets. The bell is also metal with a ribbed spherical head, and often depicts the face of Akasadhatvisvari, a female buddha and the consort of Vairocana.

The vajra has also been associated as the weapon of Indra, the Vedic king of the devas and Svarga. In Hindu mythology, the vajra is depicted as one of the most powerful weapons in the universe.

== Etymology ==
According to Asko Parpola, the Sanskrit vajra- (वज्र-) and its Avestan cognate vazra- are possibly ultimately derived from the Proto-Indo-European root *weg'- which means "to be(come) powerful". The related Proto-West-Uralic *vaśara ("axe, mace", (later) "hammer"; whence Ukonvasara, "Ukko's hammer") is an early loanword from the Proto-Indo-Aryan *vaj’ra- but not from Proto-Iranian, state Parpola and Carpelan, because its palatalized sibilant is not consistent with the depalatalization which occurred in Proto-Iranian.

== Hinduism ==
=== Rigveda ===
Traditionally, the earliest mention of the vajra is in the Rigveda, part of the four Vedas, though inscription wise, the earliest mention is being part of the name of a Javanese king. It is described as the weapon of Indra, the chief among the devas. Indra is described as using the vajra to kill sinners and ignorant persons. The Rigveda states that the weapon was made for Indra by Tvaṣṭṛ, the maker of divine instruments. The associated story describes Indra using the vajra, which he held in his hand, to slay the asura Vritra, who took the form of a serpent. In the context of Rigvedic weaponry, the word vájra appears to have been used for the sling as a weapon, but also for extremely effective sling projectiles specially crafted from lead corresponding to cast lead projectiles as they were in widespread use in the cultural areas of the Middle East and the ancient world, especially in classical antiquity.

On account of his skill in wielding the vajra, some epithets used for Indra in the Rigveda were Vajrabhrit (bearing the vajra), Vajrivat or Vajrin (armed with the vajra), Vajradaksina (holding the vajra in his right hand), and Vajrabahu or Vajrahasta (holding the vajra in his hand). The association of the Vajra with Indra continued with some modifications in the later Puranic literature, and in Buddhist works. Buddhaghoṣa, a major figure of Theravada Buddhism in the 5th century, identified the Bodhisattva Vajrapani with Indra.

=== Puranas ===
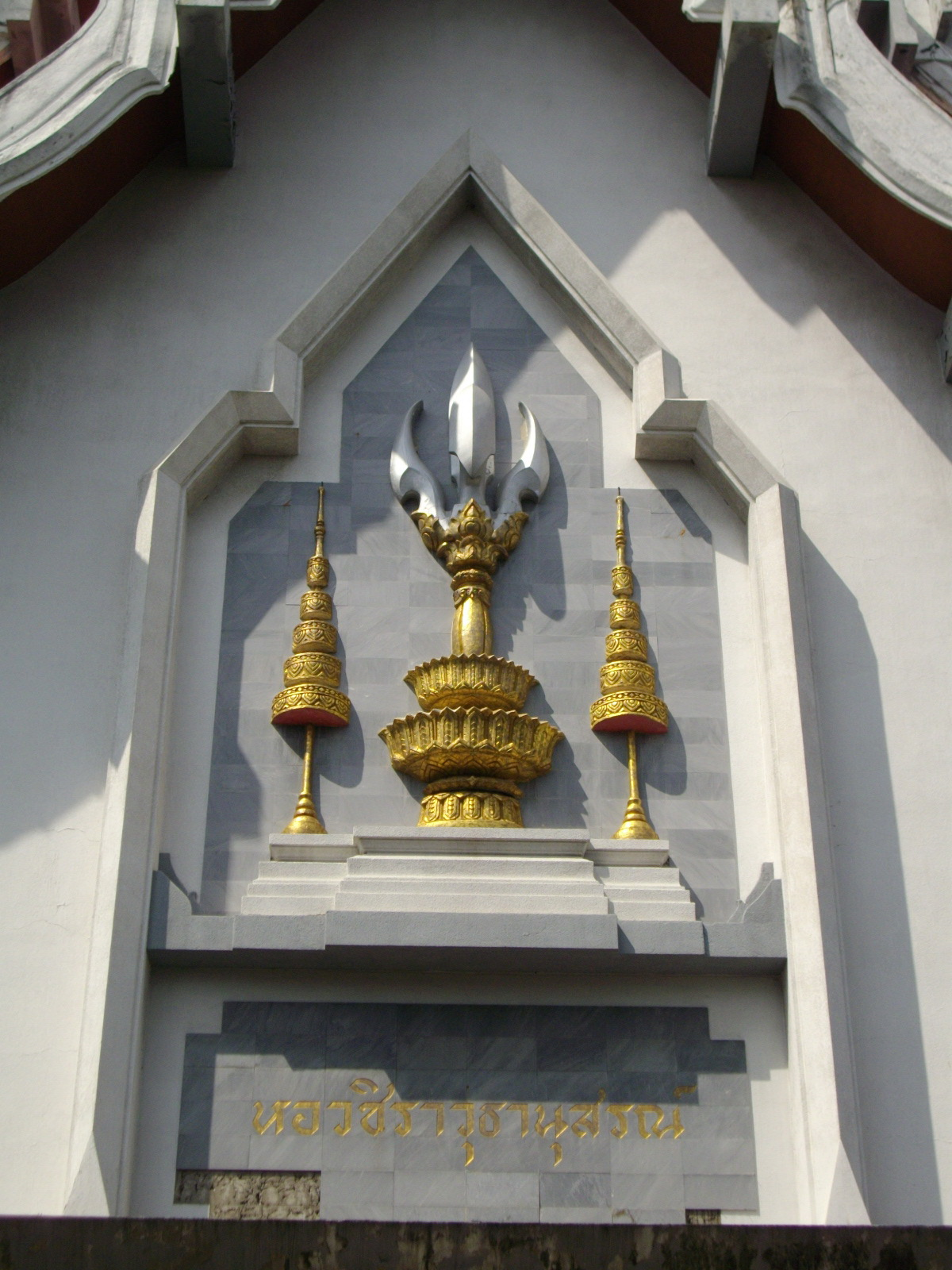
Indra's vajra as the privy seal of King Vajiravudh of Thailand

Many later puranas describe the vajra, with the story modified from the Rigvedic original. One major addition involves the role of the Sage Dadhichi. According to one account, Indra, the king of the devas, was once driven out of Devaloka by an asura named Vritra. The asura was the recipient of a boon whereby he could not be killed by any weapon that was known till the date of his receiving the boon, and additionally, that no weapon made of wood or metal could harm him. Indra, who had lost all hope of recovering his kingdom is said to have approached Shiva, who could not help him. Indra, along with Shiva and Brahma, went to seek the aid of Vishnu. Vishnu revealed to Indra that only the weapon made from the bones of Dadhichi would defeat Vritra. Indra and the other devas, therefore, approached the sage, whom Indra had once beheaded, and asked him for his aid in defeating Vritra. Dadhichi acceded to the devas' request, but said that he wished that he had time to go on a pilgrimage to all the holy rivers before he gave up his life for them. Indra then brought together all the waters of the holy rivers to Naimisha Forest, thereby allowing the sage to have his wish fulfilled without a further loss of time. Dadhichi is then said to have given up his life by the art of yoga after which the devas fashioned the vajrayudha from his spine. This weapon was then used to defeat the asura, allowing Indra to reclaim his place as the king of Devaloka.

Another version of the story exists where Dadhichi was asked to safeguard the weapons of the devas as they were unable to match the arcane arts being employed by the asura to obtain them. Dadhichi is said to have kept at the task for a very long time and finally tiring of the job, he is said to have dissolved the weapons in sacred water which he drank. The deva returned a long time later and asked him to return their weapons so that they might defeat the asura, headed by Vritra, once and for all. Dadhichi however told them of what he had done and informed them that their weapons were now a part of his bones. However, Dadhichi, realising that his bones were the only way by which the deva could defeat the asura willingly gave his life in a pit of mystical flames he summoned with the power of his austerities. Brahma is then said to have fashioned a large number of weapons from Dadhichi's bones, including the vajrayudha, which was fashioned from his spine. The deva are then said to have defeated the asura using the weapons thus created.

There have also been instances where the war god Skanda (Kartikeya) is described as holding a vajra.

=== Ramayana ===
According to the Ramayana, as a child, Hanuman grew to enormous proportions, and attempted to swallow the sun, regarding it to be a ripe fruit. He also attempted to devour Rahu, who had been divinely assigned the function of swallowing the sun. Furious, Rahu pleaded his case to Indra, who immediately appeared to the scene upon his elephant mount, Airavata. When Hanuman attempted to seize his mount, Indra retaliated by striking Hanuman's chin with the vajra. Hanuman fell toward the earth, where the child's spiritual father and god of the wind, Vayu, caught him before he crashed upon the ground, and withdrew with him to a cave. In retaliation, he called upon all of the air that permeated creation, causing the suffocation of all life in the universe. Brahma, the god of creation, summoned a number of deities to the cave to placate Vayu. Indra imbued the limbs of Hanuman with the power of his celestial thunderbolt.

== Vajrayana Buddhism ==
In Buddhism, the vajra or dorje is the symbol of the Vajrayana, one of the three major schools of Buddhism and most identified with Tibetan Buddhism. Vajrayana is translated as "Thunderbolt Way" or "Diamond Way", and can imply the thunderbolt experience of Buddhist enlightenment or bodhi. It also implies indestructibility, just as diamonds are harder than other gemstones.

=== Symbolism ===
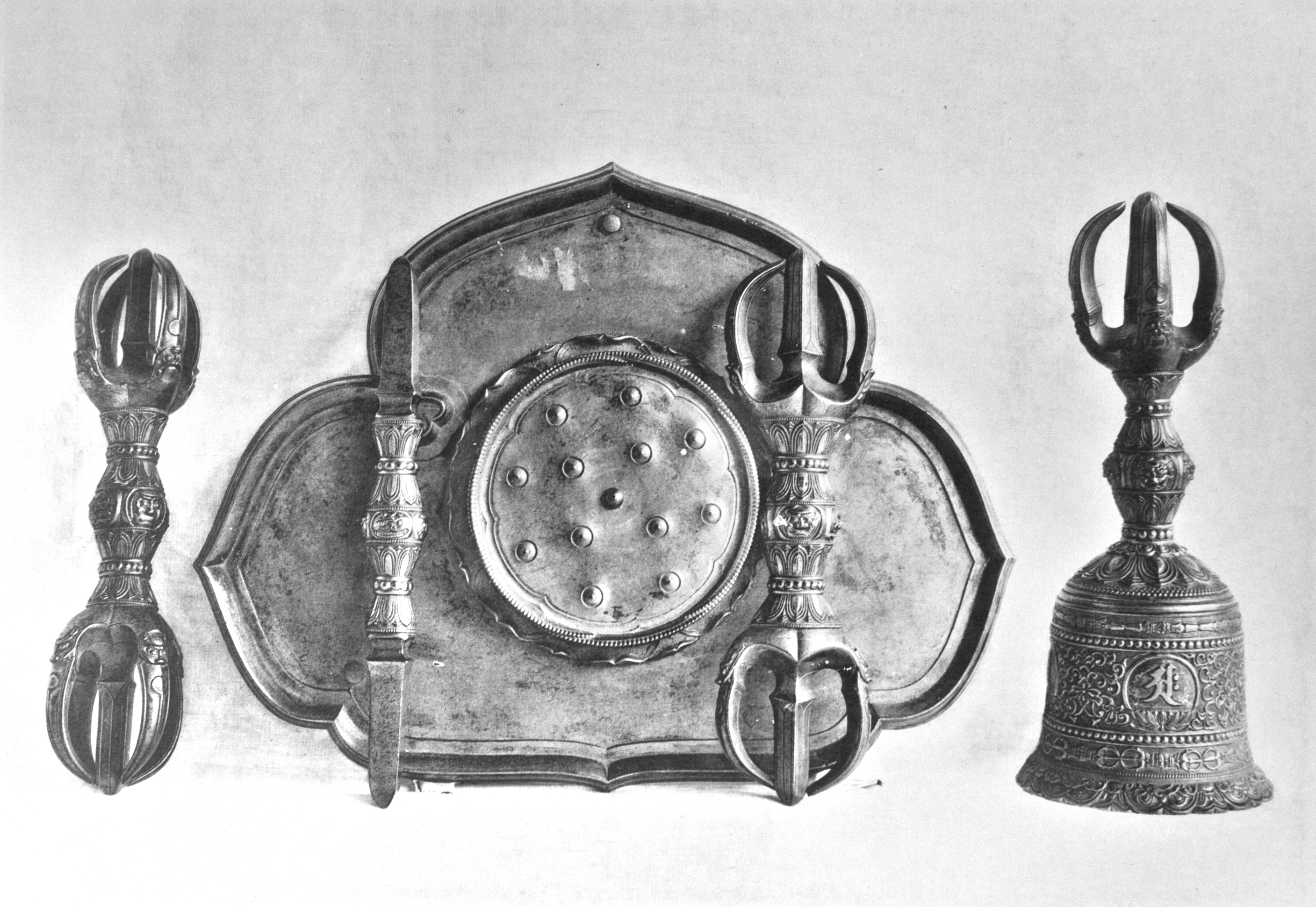
Five Vajrayana ritual objects at Itsukushima Shrine, Japan: a five-pronged vajra (五鈷杵, gokosho), a one-pronged vajra (独鈷杵, tokkosho), a vajra tray (金剛盤, kongōban), a three-pronged vajra (三鈷杵, sankosho), and a five-pronged vajra bell (五鈷鈴, gokorei).

In the tantric Vajrayana traditions of Buddhism, the vajra is a symbol for the nature of reality, or sunyata, indicating endless creativity, potency, and skillful activity. The vajra and bell are used in many recitation rituals by Vajrayana practitioners who have received permission. The vajra is a male polysemic symbol that represents many things for the tantrika, and the bell is a symbol of the female. The vajra is representative of upaya or skillful means, whereas its companion tool, the bell, denotes prajna or wisdom. Some deities are shown holding each the vajra and bell in separate hands, symbolizing the union of the forces of compassion and wisdom, respectively.

=== Vajra ===
An instrument symbolizing vajra is extensively used in the rituals of the tantra. It consists of a spherical central section, with two symmetrical sets of five prongs, which arc out from lotus blooms on either side of the sphere and come to a point at two points equidistant from the centre, thus giving it the appearance of a "diamond sceptre", which is how the term is sometimes translated.

The vajra is made up of several parts. In the center is a sphere which represents śūnyatā, the primordial nature of the universe, the underlying unity of all things. Emerging from the sphere are two eight-petaled lotus flowers. One represents the phenomenal world (or in Buddhist terms Samsara), the other represents the noumenal world (Nirvana). This is one of the fundamental dichotomies which are perceived by the unenlightened.

Arranged equally around the mouth of the lotus are two, four, or eight creatures which are called makara. These are mythological half-fish, half-crocodile creatures representing the union of opposites. From the mouths of the makara come tongues which come together in a point.

The five-pronged vajra (with four makara, plus a central prong) is the most commonly seen vajra. There is an elaborate system of correspondences between the five elements of the noumenal side of the vajra, and the phenomenal side. One important correspondence is between the five "poisons" with the five wisdoms. The five poisons are the mental states that obscure the original purity of a being's mind, while the five wisdoms are the five most important aspects of the enlightened mind. Each of the five wisdoms is also associated with a Buddha figure. (see also Five Wisdom Buddhas)

=== Accompanying bell ===
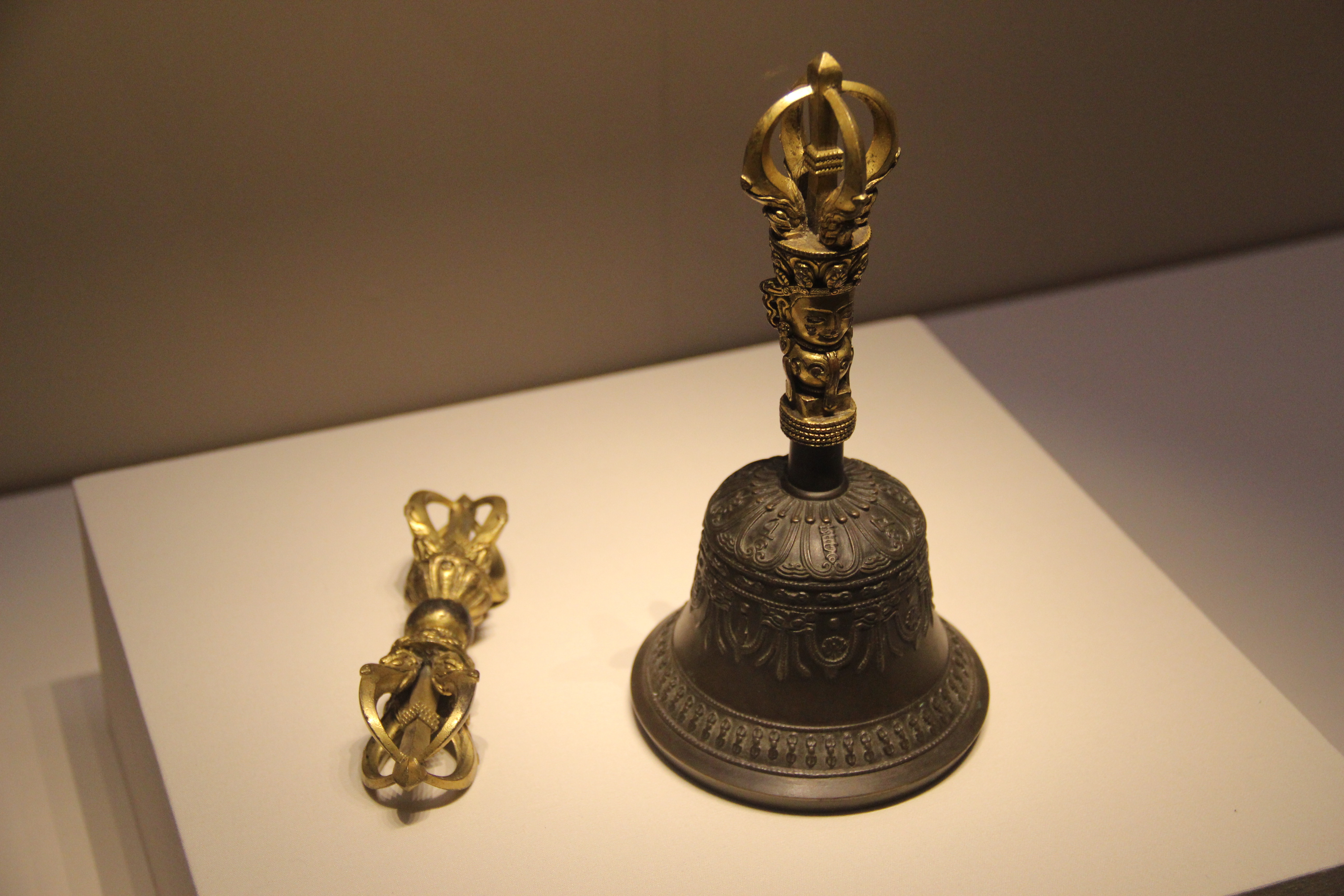
Chinese five-pronged vajra (jīngāngchǔ 金剛杵) and ghanta (jīngānglíng 金剛鈴), made during the Xuande period of the Ming dynasty. In Chinese Buddhism, these instruments are usually utilized during esoteric rituals that incorporate tantric elements, such as the Yujia Yankou (瑜伽焰口) and the Shuilu Fahui (水陸法會).

The vajra is almost always paired with a ritual bell called a ghanta. The Tibetan term for the ritual bell used in Buddhist religious practices is "dril bu" (འབྲིལ་བུ). Priests and devotees ring bells during the rituals. Together these ritual implements represent the inseparability of wisdom and compassion.

The bell is the most commonly used of all musical instruments in tantric Buddhist ritual. The sound made by the bells is regarded as very auspicious and is believed to drive out evil spirits from where the ritual is being performed. When the bell is being used with the vajra its use is varied depending on the ritual or the mantras being chanted. During meditation ringing the bell represents the sound of Buddha teaching the dharma and symbolizes the attainment of wisdom and the understanding of emptiness. During the chanting of the mantras the bell and vajra are used together in a variety of different ritualistic ways to represent the union of the male and female principles.

The hollow of the bell represents the void from which all phenomena arise, including the sound of the bell, and the clapper represents form. Together they symbolize wisdom (emptiness) and compassion (form or appearance). The sound, like all phenomena, arises, radiates forth and then dissolves back into emptiness.

=== Iconography and religious terminology ===
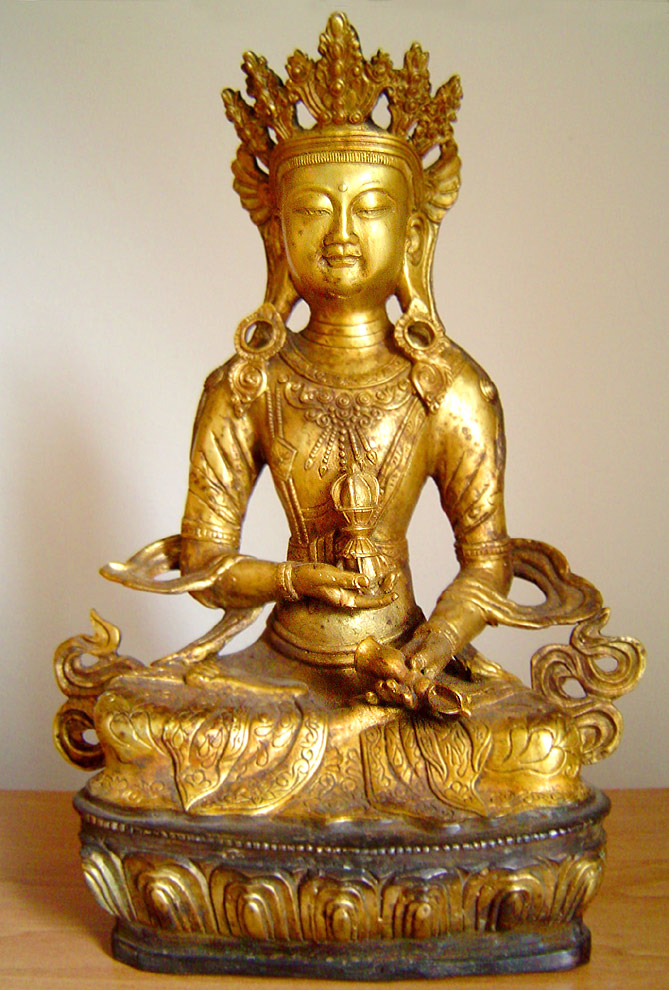
Vajrasattva holds the vajra in his right hand and a bell in his left hand.

Various figures in Tantric iconography are represented holding or wielding the vajra. The most famous of these are Vajrapani, Vajrasattva, and Vajradhara. The figure of the Wrathful Vajrapani (lit. vajra in the hand) brandishes the vajra, in his right hand, above his head. Vajrasattva (lit. vajra-being) holds the vajra, in his right hand, to his heart. Vajradhara holds the vajra and bell with hands crossed at his heart.

The term is employed extensively in tantric literature: the term for the spiritual teacher is the vajracharya; one of the five dhyani buddhas is vajrasattva, and so on. The practice of prefixing terms, names, places, and so on by vajra represents the conscious attempt to recognize the transcendental aspect of all phenomena; it became part of the process of "sacramentalizing" the activities of the spiritual practitioner and encouraged him to engage all his psychophysical energies in the spiritual life.

== In culture ==
Hindu nun Sister Nivedita designed a proposed flag for independent India with the vajra in yellow on red background. Param Vir Chakra, India's highest wartime military decoration, has a motif of Vajra, the weapon of Indra created by the bones donated by sage Dadhichi, as tribute to his sacrifice.

The double vajra has been added to Unicode as U+0FC7 ࿇ TIBETAN SYMBOL RDO RJE RGYA GRAM.

== See also ==
- Diamond Sutra – Buddhist sutra in Mahāyāna Buddhism
- Padmasambhava – 8th-century Buddhist lama
- Phurba – Tibetan ritual implement
- Trishula – Symbol in Hinduism
