= Hercules' Club (amulet) =

Roman Empire artefact type

Three Hercules' Clubs from Lower Bavaria

The Willingham Fen bronze mace

Hercules' Club (also Hercules-club, Club-of-Hercules; German Herkuleskeule, Donarkeule) is a Roman Empire and Migration-era artefact type.

Roman-era Hercules's Clubs appear from the 2nd to the 3rd century, spread over the empire (including in Roman Britain, cf. Cool 1986), mostly made of gold, shaped like wooden clubs.

A specimen found in Köln-Nippes bears the inscription "DEO HER[culi]", confirming the association with Hercules. Indeed, already Tacitus mentions a special affinity of the Germans for Hercules, stating "they say that Hercules, too, once visited them; and when going into battle, they sing of him first of all heroes." This Hercules may be Tacitus' identification of Donar through interpretatio romana.

There are two basic types, the smaller type (ca. 3 cm) cast in molds, and the larger (ca. 5 cm) wrought from sheet metal. A type of bone pendants found in Iron Age (Biblical period) Palestine is also associated with the Club-of-Hercules jewelry of the Roman era (Platt 1978). A votive mace made of bronze found in Willingham Fen, Cambridgeshire in 1857 follows the Roman model in shape and the representation of wooden knobs on the club, but adding indigenous (Celtic) iconography by depicting animal heads, anthropomorphic figures and a wheel at the club's base.

In the 5th to 7th centuries, during the Germanic migration, the amulet type rapidly spread from the Elbe Germanic area across Europe. These Germanic "Donar's Clubs" were made from deer antler, bone or wood, more rarely also from bronze or precious metals. They are found exclusively in female graves, apparently worn either as a belt pendant, or as an ear pendant.

The amulet type was replaced by the Viking Age Thor's hammer pendants in the course of the Christianization of Scandinavia from the 8th to 9th century.

== See also ==
- Migration period art
- Donar's oak
- Thor's hammer
