= Dark Rider =

Dark Rider(s) or The Dark Rider(s) may refer to:

- Nazgûl, Sauron's chief servants in the fantasy book The Lord of the Rings by J.R.R. Tolkien
- Dark Riders (comics), a supervillain team in Marvel Comics
- Dark Riders (Fifth Cycle), a 1991 supplement for the role-playing game Fifth Cycle
- Dark Riders, an expansion set of the Mage Knight miniatures wargame
- Dark Riders, a record label created by the English band Black Spiders
- "The Dark Riders", an episode of Strange Empire
- "Dark Riders" (featuring Buc Fifty), a song by Swollen Members from the 2001 album Bad Dreams
- The Dark Riders, a 1971 painting by Carle Hessay

== See also ==
- Black Rider (disambiguation)
