= Anglo-Saxon metrical charms =

Magical recipes in Old English

Anglo-Saxon metrical charms were sets of instructions generally written to magically resolve a situation or disease. Usually, these charms involve some sort of physical action, including making a medical potion, repeating a certain set of words, or writing a specific set of words on an object. These Anglo-Saxon charms tell a great deal about medieval medical theory and practice. Although most medical texts found from the pre-Christian Anglo-Saxon period are translations of Classical texts in Latin, these charms were originally written in Old English.

Today, some alternative medical practitioners continue to use herbal remedies, but these are often based on some sort of scientific reasoning. The medical procedures and herbal remedies in these Anglo-Saxon medical charms are not based on science, but on spiritual qualities. While many of these charms do have pagan qualities, Christian influences are regularly observed, with most of the charms including both pagan and Christian characteristics. For example, the Nine Herbs Charm mentions both the Germanic god Woden and Jesus Christ, the central figure of Christianity.

== Known charms ==
Twelve Metrical Charms survive in Old English, principally in the collection of medical texts known in modern scholarship as Lacnunga (10th to 11th century), but also in Bald's Leechbook (10th century) and as marginal additions in other manuscripts. They are:

Æcerbot
This charm, also known as "For Unfruitful Land," is a charm meant to "heal" lands that have yielded poorly.
Against a Dwarf
The express purpose of this charm has yet to be decided upon by scholars, but some believe that the dwarf is some sort of disease (perhaps one that involves a fever).
Against a Wen
This charm is supposed to rid a person of a wen, which is the Old English word for a cyst or skin blemish.
A Journey Charm
This charm's purpose is to ask God and other various Biblical figures to protect one on his or her journey.
For a Swarm of Bees
This charm, also known as The Old English Bee Charm, is meant to protect one from a swarm of bees.
For Loss of Cattle #1
For Loss of Cattle #2
For Loss of Cattle #3
All three charms titled "For Loss of Cattle," are meant to help one find stolen cattle.
For Delayed Birth
This charm's purpose is to help a woman who is unable to bring her unborn child to term.
For the Water-Elf Disease
This charm is meant to heal one of the water-elf disease, which involves pale and ill-looking nails and watery eyes.
Nine Herbs Charm
This charm is meant to heal an infection or disease using nine specific herbs.
Wið færstice
This charm, also known as "For a Sudden Stitch," describes how to heal a sudden and sharp pain; this pain is thought by some scholars to be rheumatism.

== Digital Editions ==
- Foys, Martin et al. Old English Poetry in Facsimile Project (Center for the History of Print and Digital Culture, University of Wisconsin-Madison, 2019-); digital facsimile edition and Modern English translation
