= Birthing girdle =

Talisman used during pregnancy and childbirth

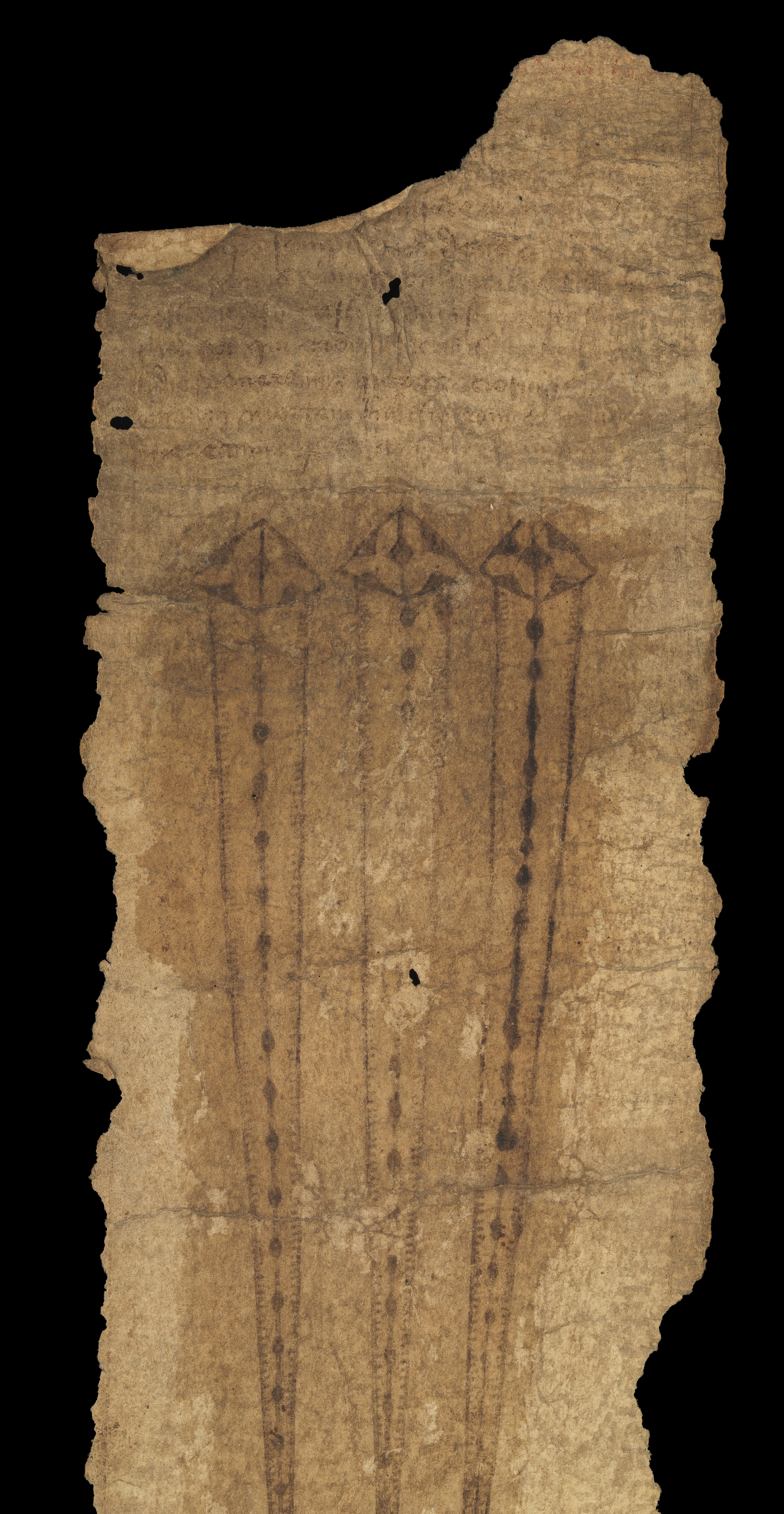
Extract from MS.632 (see below)

A birthing girdle was a talisman used during pregnancy and childbirth in Medieval England. Girdles were especially popular between the 12th and 16th centuries. A type of prayer roll, a girdle consisted of a strip (most commonly parchment, silk, or paper) inscribed with Christian prayers for the mother and child's safety, holy texts, and religious imagery. Girdles were usually produced and owned by monasteries who rented them to parishioners in need. Like most talismans and magical objects, birthing girdles were banned during the English Reformation and most examples were destroyed in the dissolution of the monasteries from 1536. However, their use continued surreptitiously into the 17th century.

== Background ==
In the Middle Ages, childbirth was very dangerous. It is thought to have been the leading cause of death for women in early medieval England. In 11th-century Norwich, for example, infant mortality was 60% and the average woman died aged 33. Complications were common and the risk of post-partum infection was high, especially during periods of plague which increased mortality considerably.

As well as fearing for their physical health, women had to worry about their spiritual health should they die during childbirth. Because childbirth was considered a polluted situation, women needed to undergo a cleansing ritual called churching before returning to religious spaces. Her death before this was completed could affect the future of her soul. According to Church doctrine, however, the greater priority for midwives was ensuring that the child was baptised, even if it died before entirely leaving the womb, to avoid it being trapped in limbo.

== Precursors ==
Birthing girdles are a lineage of Christian, pagan, and hybrid religious charms dating to the pre-Medieval period. Surviving Anglo-Saxon metrical charms include a poem "For delayed birth" but these texts drew their power from being spoken aloud not from contact. Closer parallels can be found with Byzanto-Christian amulets from before the 7th-century, many of which still survive. These can be connected to the Egyptian amulet tradition which goes back to at least the Middle Kingdom (c.1700 BC).

Despite being a legacy of pagan religions and initially resisted by church fathers like St. Augustine, Christian theology gradually embraced charms over the course of the High Middle Ages. Increasing lay literacy rates led to ever higher demand, and by the 13th century the Church offered a wide array of talismans, amulets, and relics to those in need, including pregnant women. However, surviving records show that birthing girdles were the most commonly loaned.

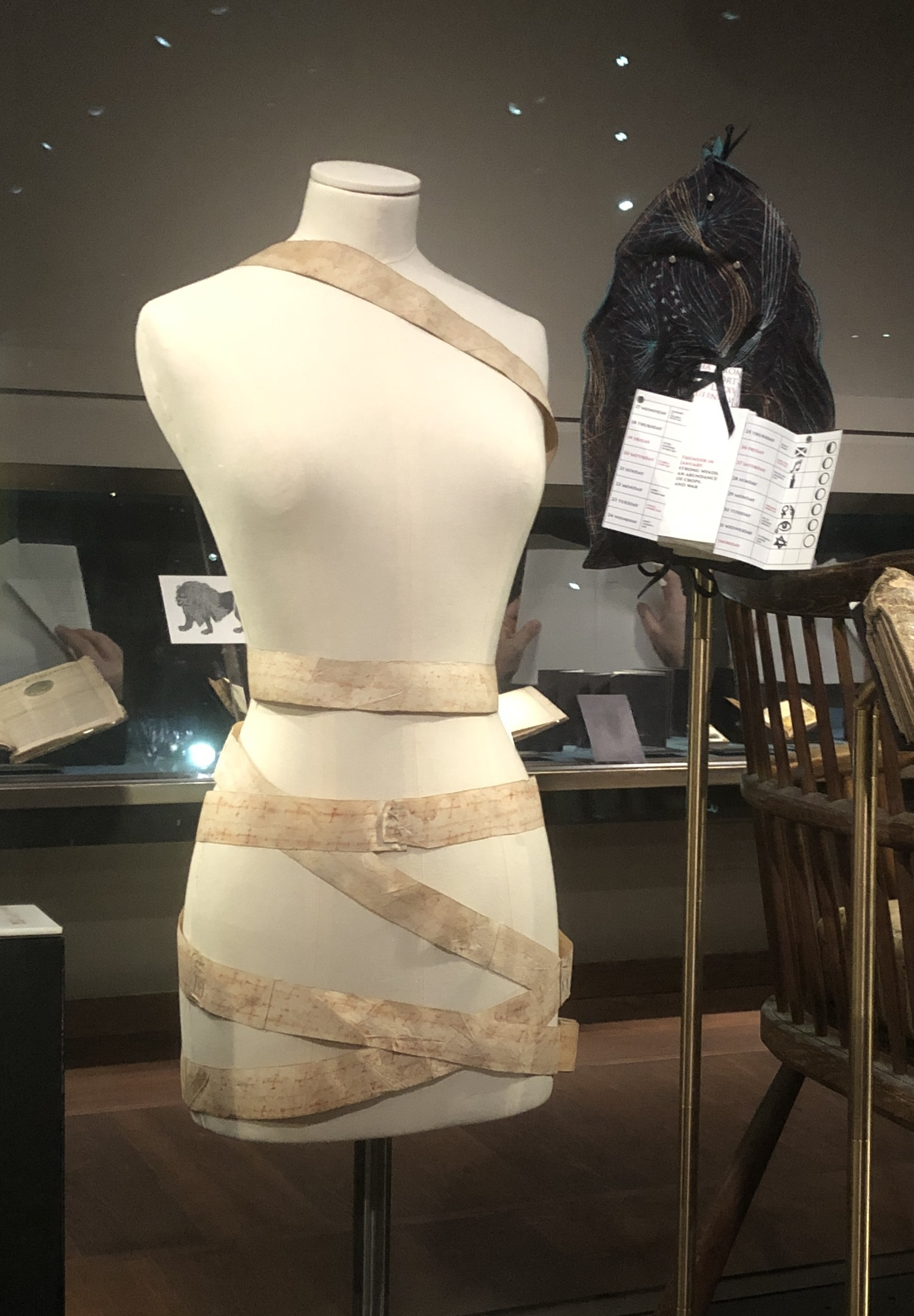
Oxford Bodlian MS Roll 26 (16th century). Although not specifically a birthing girdle, this demonstrates how such rolls might have been worn.

Girdles in various forms were a common part of Medieval clothing into the 15th century, acting like a belt, but they were normally woven or made of leather.

== Design ==
Birthing girdles served both a medical and spiritual function. Although their primary function appears to be as spiritual protection for the mother and child, some stronger girdles such as the iron one at Coverham may have helped women carry the pregnancy weight similar to modern pregnancy support belts.

Although girdles varied in size, they tended to be long and thin, to allow for wrapping around the body. To achieve this length, several pieces of parchment could be sewn together into one long piece. Don Skemer has speculated that some girdles may have been produced using leftover scraps of parchment from monasteries' scriptoria, where they were likely produced. Initially handwritten on parchment, by the late Middle Ages printed paper birthing girdles were in circulation.

== Text and iconography ==
Common imagery in birthing girdles includes the cross, instruments of crucifixion (such as nails), Christ's wounds, and scenes relating to childbirth. Spiritually significant numbers or measurements (for example the dimensions of the cross, the height of the Virgin Mary, or the number of drop of blood that fell from Christ's side) appear repeatedly, as do the names of the Magi, the apostles, and other notable figures. Such measurements were sometimes reflected in the exact dimensions of the girdle itself.

Invocations to St Quiricus and Saint Julitta are generally considered the defining textual feature of English birthing girdles. At the same time, other prayers vary considerably, appearing in Latin, Vernacular or a combination of the two. Prayers may have been arranged to align with the anatomy of the wearer, for example with prayers relating to childbirth sitting over the womb. Most kinds of prayer rolls were considered to work predominantly by proximity.

References to the Virgin Mary, the biblical model mother, are common. The girdling tradition may have been inspired by relics purporting to be the Virgin's girdle. The Passion of St Margaret, who was believed to have escaped unharmed from a dragon who swallowed her, was also frequently used as a metaphor for childbirth. Other saints commonly invoked to protect mothers in prayer rolls include Saint Anne (Mary's mother), and Saint Susanna of Rome.

Birthing girdles also contained imagery and texts not directly related to childbirth, including general prayers for protection during illness, war, and travel. This has led Dr Katherine Hindley to argue that most birthing girdles are in fact generic prayer rolls (see § Criticism of the concept).

== Use ==
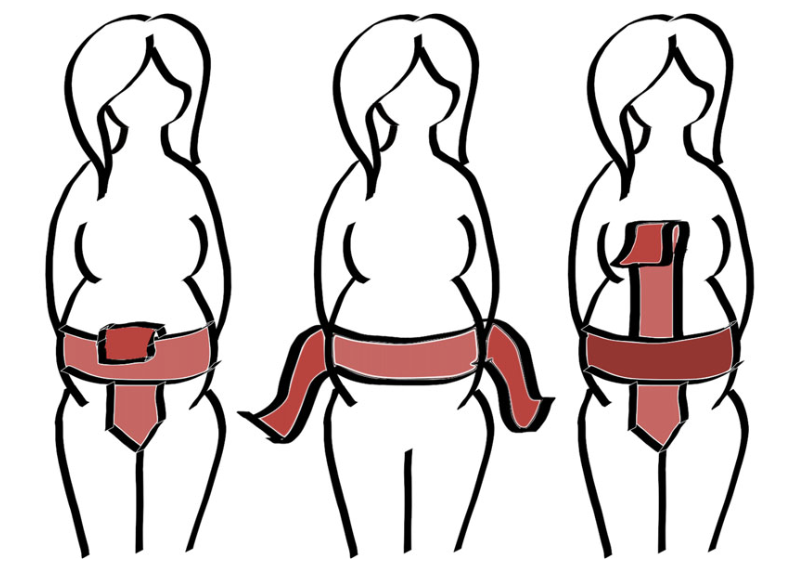
Fiddyment et al.'s illustration of possible methods of tying a birthing girdle before, during, and after labour.

Monasteries charged for the hire of the girdles. For example, in 1502 Elizabeth of York was charged six shillings and eight pence for the hire of a girdle. Some monasteries wrapped girdles around cult statues of the Virgin Mary when not in use, so that they might absorb the statues' supernatural power and function similarly to contact relics.

Girdles were worn during pregnancy and, in at least some cases, during childbirth itself. Many rolls contain vernacular English instructions on how to meditate on the passages and images provided, this included reading prayers or kissing the roll.

It is not known precisely how birthing girdles were worn, however, Dr Sarah Fiddyment speculates that they were wrapped around the body like a chastity belt. It is possible that girdles were wrapped around the groin during pregnancy and then folded up around the abdomen during childbirth to form a cross-shape.

== Other birth charms ==
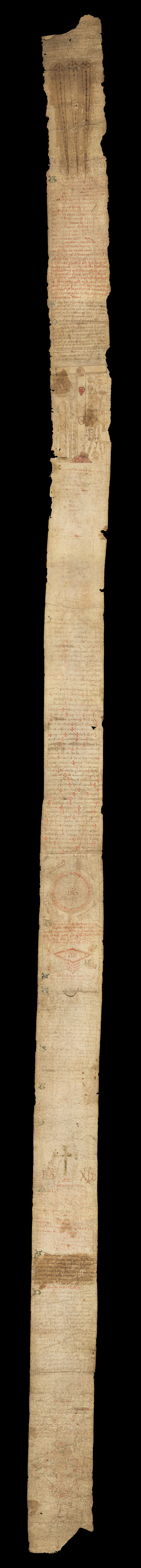
Wellcome MS.632 Recto - one of the best studied birthing girdles, notable for its staining and visible use patterns.

Prior to the emergence of written or illustrated girdles, the loins were sometimes wrapped with animal skin. The Trotula, a 12th-century manuscript on women's health recommends girding the loins with a snake skin to encourage the child to emerge like the snake from its skin. Likewise The Sickness of Women, a 15th-century manuscript, recommends a deer skin girdle. However, neither of these sources specifically mention prayers or illustrations on such girdles.

Even after the emergence of manuscript girdles, other charms continued to be used. Smaller textual amulets were common, often applied to specific points of a woman's body or in some cases even swallowed. In addition to these single-use amulets, relevant sections of books might be read by midwives as both blessing and encouragement. To this end, manuscripts of St Margaret's passion are often accompanied by instructions to bless the mother with the book.

== Criticism of the concept ==
Dr Katherine Hindley of NTU, Singapore, argues that the term 'birth girdle' is misleading and that many girdles identified as such were instead used for a variety of protective purposes. Hindley says these rolls should be considered in the context of other codices and Medieval texts offering protective prayers and symbolism, which can feature Quiricus and Julitta outside a childbirth context. Furthermore, she points to men's ownership marks on such rolls as proof that they were not intended solely for use during childbirth.

Nonetheless, she identifies Wellcome MS.632 and Takamiya MS.56 as two genuine birth girdles, highlighting their narrowness, height matching the Virgin Mary, and lengthwise text on the reverse as unique features that make them well suited to wearing as a girdle. Both manuscripts' inscriptions explicitly mention being worn during pregnancy, which other rolls commonly identified as birthing girdles do not.

== Preservation and research ==
During the Reformation, birthing girdles were repeatedly banned by bishops and were frequently destroyed during the dissolution of the monasteries. As a result, few birthing girdles survive (Fiddyment et al. identified eight English and two French girdles surviving in British collections). Of these one (STC 14547.5, from c.1533) is printed on paper while the others are parchment.

=== Surviving girdles ===
Where available this list links to a digitised record of the manuscript in question.

==== Wellcome Collection MS.632 ====
Wellcome Western MS.632 is a late 15th-century birthing girdle from the Wellcome Collection which is notable for bearing stains from the birthing process. These stains were analysed using palaeoproteomic techniques by a team at the McDonald Institute for Archaeological Research at Cambridge. Their research identified that the parchment was made of sheepskin and found proteins evidencing traces of honey, milk, eggs, legumes, and cereals. Drawing on evidence from The Trotula and The Sickness of Women, the team suggest that these ingredients were applied to the vagina in Medieval midwifery. Furthermore, traces of human proteins suggest that the girdle was worn throughout labour, rather than just during pregnancy as had previously been speculated.

The prayer on the reverse of the roll concludes:

And yf a woman travell wyth chylde gyrdes thys mesure abowte

hyr wombe and she shall be safe delyvyrd wythowte parelle and

the chylde shall have crystendome and the mother puryfycatyon.

(If a woman travailing with child girds this measure about her womb, she shall be delivered safely without peril, and the child shall have christendom and the mother purification.)

==== Takamiya MS.56 ====
Produced between 1435 and 1450, MS.56 is a notable early example of the birth girdle tradition. Like MS.632 it features an inscription explicitly mentioning wrapping it around the body:

And a woma(n) that ys quyck wythe chylde [girde] hir wythe thys mesure and she shall be safe fro(m) all man(er) of p(er)illis And a woman who is quick with child girde herself with this measure and she shall be safe from all manner of perils)

==== New Haven, CT, Beinecke Rare Book & Manuscript Library, Beinecke MS 410 ====
Source:

==== New York, NY, Pierpont Morgan Library, MS Glazier 39 ====
Paris, Bibliothèque Nationale de France, Nouvelles Acquisitions Françaises, no. 4267 [3rd piece]

== See also ==
- Amulet § Christianity
- Apotropaic magic - protective magic
- Talisman
