= For Loss or Theft of Cattle =

Anglo-Saxon metrical charm

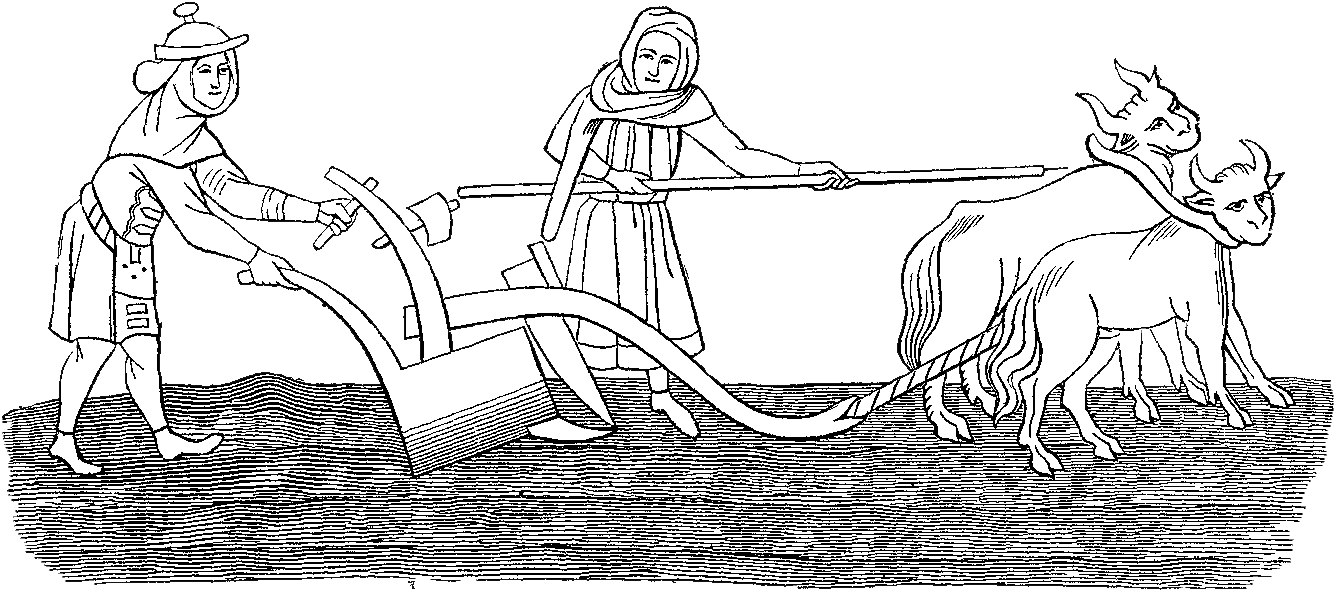
Facsimile of a miniature in an Anglo-Saxon manuscript with oxen pulling a plough

"For Loss or Theft of Cattle," or "For Loss of Cattle," is the name given to three Anglo-Saxon metrical charms that were intended for use in keeping cattle from being stolen and ensuring their return.

Charm V and Charm X represent two versions of the same macaronic text in Old English and Latin. Felix Grendon pointed out that lines 6–19 of Charm IX are significantly more "heathen" than the prose introduction.

== Charm V (For Loss of Cattle 1) ==
This charm is found in the Lacnunga manuscript.

þonne þe mon ærest secge þæt þin ceap sy losod, þonne
cweð þu ærest, ær þu elles hwæt cweþe:
Bæðleem hatte seo buruh þe Crist on acænned wæs,
seo is gemærsod geond ealne middangeard;
swa þyos dæd for monnum mære gewurþe
þurh þa haligan Cristes rode! Amen. Gebide þe þonne
þriwa east and cweþ þonne þriwa: Crux Christi ab oriente
reducað. Gebide þe þonne þriwa west and cweð þonne
þriwa: Crux Christi ab occidente reducat. Gebide þe
þonne þriwa suð and cweþ þriwa: Crux Christi ab austro
reducat. Gebide þonne þriwa norð and cweð þriwa: Crux
Christi ab aquilone reducað, crux Christi abscondita est et
inventa est. Iudeas Crist ahengon, dydon dæda þa
wyrrestan, hælon þæt hy forhelan ne mihtan. Swa þeos
dæd nænige þinga forholen ne wurþe þurh þa haligan
Cristes rode. Amen.

When someone says to you that your property has been lost, then
you must say first, before you say anything else:

The town is called Bethlehem where Christ was born,
that is well known throughout all middle-earth—
so he performed a famous deed for mankind
through that Holy Rood! Amen! Look towards
the east three times and speak three times: The Cross of Christ is led forth from
the east! Look towards the west three times and speak three
times: The Cross of Christ is led forth from the west! Look towards
the south three times and speak three times: The Cross of Christ is led forth from
the south! Look towards the north three times and speak three times: The Cross
of Christ is led forth from the north! The Cross of Christ was hidden and
then found! Judas has Christ hung up, doing the worst of deeds,
covering him so that he could not be hidden. So by
this deed may nothing be hidden through
the Holy Rood of Christ. Amen.

== Charm IX (For Loss of Cattle 2) ==
This charm, entirely in Old English, was found in the margins of CCCC 41, a manuscript believed to be from Southern England.

Ne forstolen ne forholen nanuht, þæs ðe ic age, þe ma ðe
mihte Herod urne drihten. Ic geþohte sancte Eadelenan (Note: Also read as "Elenan")
and ic geþohte Crist on rode ahangen; swa ic þence þis feoh
to findanne, næs to oðfeorrganne, and to witanne, næs to
oðwyrceanne, and to lufianne, næs to oðlædanne.

Garmund, godes ðegen,
find þæt feoh and fere þæt feoh
and hafa þæt feoh and heald þæt feoh
and fere ham þæt feoh.

þæt he næfre næbbe landes, þæt he hit oðlæde,
ne foldan, þæt hit oðferie,
ne husa, þæt he hit oðhealde.

Gif hyt hwa gedo, ne gedige hit him næfre!
Binnan þrym nihtum cunne ic his mihta,
his mægen and his mihta and his mundcræftas.

Eall he weornige, swa syre wudu weornie,
swa breðel seo swa þystel,
se ðe ðis feoh oðfergean þence
oððe ðis orf oðehtian ðence.

Amen.

Nothing was stolen or concealed, after I owned it, any more than
Herod could do to Our Lord. I thought Saint Eadelena
and I thought Christ was hung upon the Rood—so I intend
to find these cattle—they were not taken away, to be known and not
harmed, and to be loved and not led away.

Garmund, the thane of God,
find those cattle and bear those cattle
and keep those cattle and hold those cattle
and bear those cattle home.

So he may never keep his lands, who has led them away—
nor earth, who has borne them away—
nor household, who has withheld them.

If he who has done this, may it never avail him!
Within three nights, I know his power,
his strength and his power and his hand-skills

May all of his wither away, as the woods waste away—
as worthless as the thistle—
him who meant to steal away these cattle,
or who meant to drive away this herd.

Amen.

== Charm X (For Loss of Cattle 3) ==
This charm is found in CCCC 41.

ðis man sceal cweðan ðonne his ceapa hwilcne man for-
stolenne. Cwyð ær he ænyg oþer word cweðe:

Bethlem hattæ seo burh ðe Crist on geboren wes,
seo is gemærsod ofer ealne middangeard;
swa ðeos dæd wyrþe for monnum mære,
per crucem Christi!

And gebide þe ðonne þriwa east and cweð þriwa:

Crux Christi ab oriente reducat.

And III west and cweð:

Crux Christi ab occidente reducat.

And III suð and cweð:

Crux Christi a meridie reducant.

And III norð and cweð:

Crux Christi abscondita sunt et inventa est.

Iudeas Crist ahengon, gedidon him dæda þa wyrstan; hælon þæt hi forhelan ne mihton. Swa næfre ðeos dæd forholen ne wyrðeper crucem Christi.

This man must speak thus when any man has stolen his property.
He says this before he should speak any other word:

The town is called Bethlehem, where Christ was born,
it is made famous over all of middle-earth—
so was this deed made famous in front of mankind,
by the cross of Christ!

And then look towards the east three times and say three times:

The cross of Christ is led forth from the east!

And three times to the west and speak:

The cross of Christ is led forth from the west!

And three times to the south and speak:

The cross of Christ is led forth from high noon!

And three times to the north and speak:

The cross of Christ was hidden and found again!

Judas (Note: Also translated as "The Jews") hung up Christ, he did for himself the worst of deeds. He hid that but could not conceal him. As never this deed could become concealed. By the cross of Christ.
