= Numbers in Germanic paganism =

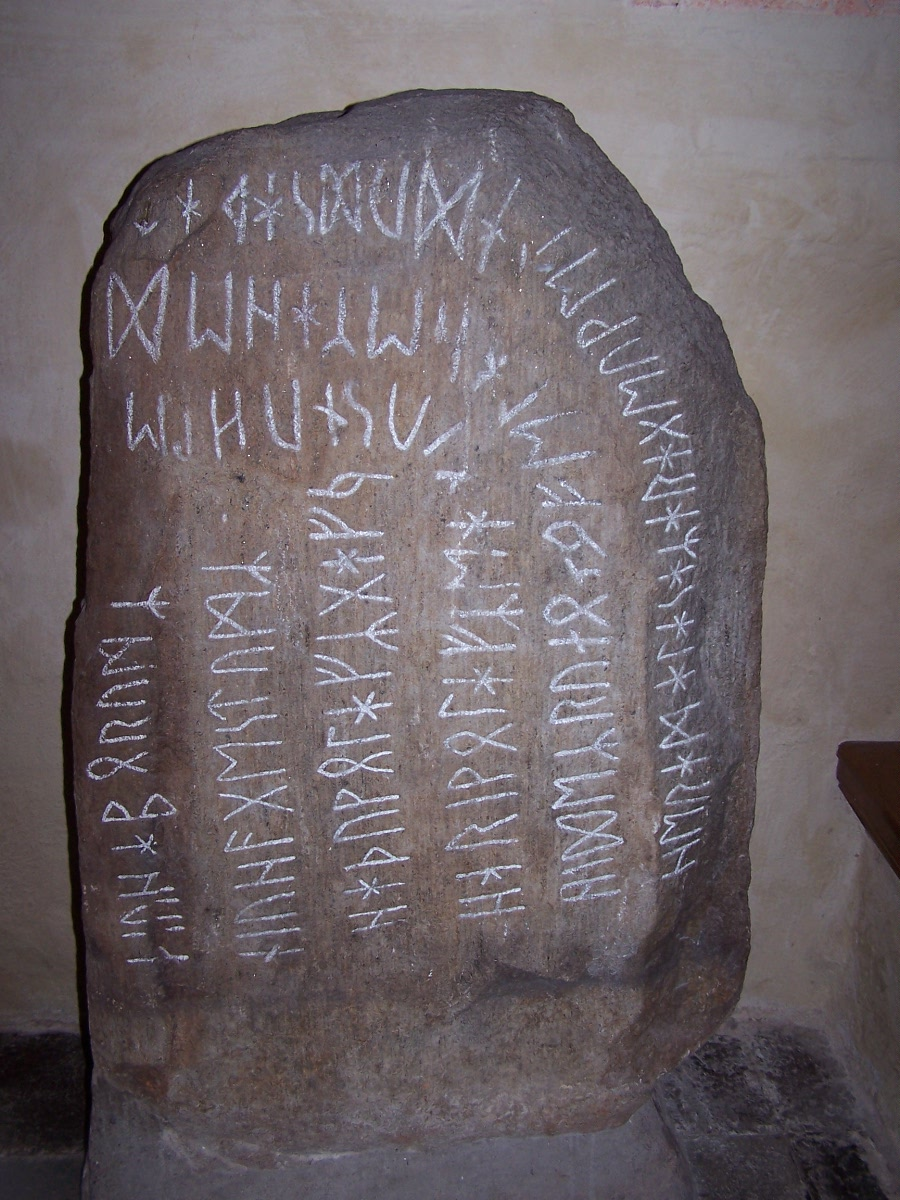
The Stentoften Stone, bearing a runic inscription that likely describes a blót of nine he-goats and nine male horses bringing fertility to the land.

The numbers three, nine, and other multiples of three are significant numbers in Germanic paganism. Both numbers (and multiples thereof) appear throughout surviving attestations of ancient Germanic folklore, in both mythology and Germanic paganism. Along with the number 27, both numbers also figure into the lunar Germanic calendar.

== Examples ==
Emphasis on the numbers three, nine, and multiples of three occur frequently in the ancient Germanic record. Examples include:

=== West Germanic ===
Old English

- Æcerbot: A charm that describes a ritual wherein the speaker should bow nine times to the east.
- Nine Herbs Charm: A charm focused on nine plants, using the number nine extensively and featuring the Old English extension of the Germanic god Odin.

Old High German

- Merseburg Charms: Two Old High German charms stemming from the pagan period mentioning at least six pagan Germanic deities and other beings. According to Patricia Giangrosso, "the second Merseburg Charm is the only medieval German charm to specify gods from the pagan, Germanic past" and "no other Old High German or Middle High German charms show so clearly a structure based on the number three. This is especially striking in the second charm."

=== North Germanic ===
The North Germanic record frequently mentions the numbers three, nine, and multiples of three. A few examples of these many occurrences in Norse mythology include:

- Odin's self-sacrifice where he hangs for nine nights on a "windy tree" (Hávamál)
- The "nine worlds" (Níu Heimar) associated with Yggdrasil (Vafþrúðnismál)
- Nine Mothers of Heimdallr
- Nine Daughters of Ægir and Rán
- The god Thor is foretold to slay the sea serpent Jörmungandr during Ragnarök and will take nine steps before succumbing to its venom

Exterior to texts on mythology, accounts of Temple of Uppsala by Adam of Bremen in what is today Sweden and of Lejre in today's Denmark by Thietmar of Merseburg purport that pagan sacrificial feasts occurred at these locations lasting nine days, where "supposedly nine victims were sacrificed each day". According to Gardeła, "Leaving aside the problem of the historical veracity of these two Latin accounts, as well as the lack of tangible traces of violent and large-scale sacrificial acts in the archaeological record at Uppsala and Lejre, the fact that both Adam and Thietmar consistently refer to the number nine in ritual contexts leads to the supposition that the chroniclers wove their stories around an authentic and widespread idea rooted in the Viking Age."

Ibn Fadlān's eyewitness account of the Viking Age Scandinavian Rus' in the first half of the 10th century on the Volga river mentions that the deceased Rus' leader's body was ritually left in a chamber for nine days before being set ablaze on a burning ship with a variety of goods and the body of a female slave.

=== Archaeology ===
A variety of objects found in the Germanic cultural sphere have been interpreted by scholars as reflecting a particular focus on the number nine. These include:

- Miniatures with nine studs found in a square or circular pattern.
- The valknut: According to scholar Leszek Gardeła, "Probably the most vivid manifestation of the number nine motif in the material culture of the Viking Age comes in the form of the so-called valknútr, a symbol carved in wood, metal and stone which usually takes the form of three inter-locking triangles (giving a total of nine triangle points)."

== Scholastic reception ==
According to scholar Rudolf Simek, "apart from the number three, which played a role in many other cultures, nine is the mythical number of the Germanic tribes. Documentation for the number nine is found in both myth and cult." In addition to the importance of three and nine, Simek highlights the importance of the number 27 (27/3=9) for the Germanic lunar calendar.

Scholars Mindy MacLeod and Bernard Mees note that, "the number nine plays a significant role in Germanic folklore: charms frequently contain nine ingredients or specify a ritual to be performed nine times". The two highlight the instruction in the Old English Æcerbot for the speaker to "turn to the east and bow nine times", the Nine Herbs Charm, and a variety of other items as examples.

As highlighted by scholar Leszek Gardeła (National Museum of Denmark), "surviving sagas and poems reveal that certain numbers held special significance among Norse societies. This was certainly the case with the numbers three and nine which are frequently mentioned in connection with the sphere of religion and/or ritual practice."

== See also ==
- Numerology
- Rök Stone
