= Æcerbot =

Anglo-Saxon charm

The Æcerbot ([ˈæ.ker.boːt]; Old English for "Field-Remedy") is an Anglo-Saxon metrical charm recorded in the 11th century, intended to remedy fields that yielded poorly.

== Overview ==
The charm consists of a partially Christianized prayer and a day-long ritual that began at night with four sods taken from the field, to the root-mats of which a poultice was applied in the form of yeast, honey, oil and milk mixed with parts of all the good herbs that grew, save buckwheat and woody plants. In Christian times the sods were taken to mass and returned to the field before nightfall, each with a small cross planted in it. This was the extent to which the ritual was Christianized. Once more in the field, the healer faced the east, where the sun would rise, turning three times clockwise and calling upon the "holy guardian of the heavenly kingdom" to "fill the earth", that the crops would grow. A plough was then anointed with a "hallowed" mix of oil, paste, frankincense, salt and fennel, of which the imported frankincense lent a Christian element; a chant was then sung, beginning erce, erce, erce eorþan modor (earth's mother)". The field was then ploughed with a chant hailing "Erce, eorthan modor."

The significance of erce has been the subject of scholarly commentary and speculation. Grimm connected Old High German erchan "genuine, true".

Kathleen Herbert observes that in the first mention of the Angli, Tacitus in his Germania, remarks that "the noteworthy characteristic of the English, to foreign eyes, was that they were goddess-worshippers; they looked on the earth as their mother." Herbert links Tacitus' mention of the Angli to the later English "Æcerbot". Herbert comments that while "Æcerbot" is referred to as a charm, it is in fact a "full-scale ritual" that would take an entire day to perform, plus additional time for collecting and preparing the materials necessary.

== See also ==
- "Nine Herbs Charm"
- "Wið færstice"
