= Military Races =

Military Races is a 1990 role-playing supplement for Fifth Cycle published by Shield Games.

== Contents ==
Military Races is a supplement in which the seven magically created Human races are detailed.

== Reception ==
Christopher Earley reviewed Military Races in White Wolf #30 (Feb., 1992), rating it a 3 out of 5 and stated that "The value of Military Races in a Fifth Cycle campaign is high, and extends even into the market of generic fantasy supplements, should players of other FRPGs wish to add one or two new races to their current system."

== Reviews ==
- Papyrus (Issue 13 - Holiday 1993)
- Dragon #179
