= Black Rider =

Black Rider or Black Riders may refer to:

== Arts and entertainment ==
- Black Rider (TV series), a 2023 Filipino action TV series
- Black Rider (character), a Marvel Comics Western character
- The Black Rider, a 1990 stage musical by Tom Waits, Robert Wilson and William S. Burroughs
- The Black Rider (album), a 1993 album by Tom Waits and its title song
- "Black Rider" (song), a 2020 song by Bob Dylan
- The Black Rider (film), a 1954 British thriller film directed by Wolf Rilla
- Schwarzfahrer, also known as Black Rider, a short film directed by Pepe Danquart, which won an Academy Award in 1993
- Nazgûl, Sauron's chief servants in the fantasy book The Lord of the Rings by J.R.R. Tolkien

== People ==
- "The Black Rider", nickname of Nikolaos Plastiras (1883–1953), Greek general and politician

== Other uses ==
- Black Riders Liberation Party, a revolutionary black power organization based in the United States

== See also ==
- Reiter or Schwarze Reiter (black riders), German cavalrymen armed with pistols
- The Black Riders and Other Lines, an 1895 book of poetry by Stephen Crane
- Kamen Rider Black, a Japanese superhero-drama television series
