= Fifth Cycle Gamescreen =

Fantasy role-playing game accessory

- Players' side of the screen
- Publishers: Shield Games
- Publication: 1990
- Genres: Fantasy

Fifth Cycle Gamescreen is a supplement published by Shield Games in 1990 for the fantasy role-playing game Fifth Cycle.

== Description ==
Fifth Cycle Gamescreen contains a three-panel cardstock gamemaster's screen and a 24-page booklet. The screen has various tables on the gamemaster's side, and a list of spells from two colleges on the player's side. The booklet contains game aids, character sheets, a spellbook page, an archaeology sheet, 6 combats sheets, 6 non-player character sheets, two "spell trees", and a short adventure titled "The Whispering Temple".

In the adventure, novice players can begin their adventures in Dolphinia, where they encounter Aristophene, who entrusts them with a dangerous mission: to go to the site of a temple abandoned since the third cycle, where several expeditions have already disappeared.

== Publication history ==
The fantasy role-playing game Fifth Cycle was published by Shield Games in 1990. The supplement Fifth Cycle GameScreen was published the same year, and cost $9.

== Reception ==
In Issue 179 of Dragon, Lester W. Smith called the included adventure "nicely defined." He also liked that the screen contained "the most important tables from the basic game."
