= A Journey Charm =

Anglo-Saxon Christian prayer

The so-called "Journey Charm" (Old English: Færeld Spell) is one of the 12 Anglo-Saxon metrical charms written in Old English. It is a prayer written to summon protection from God and various other Christian figures from the hazards of the road. It is of particular interest as evidence for popular Anglo-Saxon Christian religion.

== Content ==
A Journey Charm was a speech act, or a performative incantation, chant or prayer that was performed before a journey to ward off evil on the journey. It mainly deals with a list of biblical characters, invoking their blessing, including everyone from Adam to Christ to Peter and Paul. The poem reflects the martial character of Anglo-Saxon Christian culture: Luke gives the journeyer a sword, Seraphim give him a "glorious spear of radiant good light", and he is well armed, with mail and shield too. The text gives us a unique insight into popular religious practices of Anglo-Saxon culture, and the particular rituals prescribed for journeys.

== History ==
The charm survives in only one manuscript: the 11th-century Cambridge, Corpus Christi College MS 41, where it is written into the margins of pp. 350–53.

This text is part of the movement from oral tradition to a writing tradition, and so is marked as transitional literature - a type of go-between in which oral performances are copied, but some of the performance parts are lost, assumed to be inferred, or hinted at.

== Facsimiles and Editions ==
- The manuscript is available in digital facsimile at https://web.archive.org/web/20161018210819/https://parker.stanford.edu/parker/actions/page_turner.do?ms_no=41.
- Foys, Martin et al. Old English Poetry in Facsimile Project (Center for the History of Print and Digital Culture, University of Wisconsin-Madison, 2019-); digital facsimile edition and Modern English translation
