= Fifth Cycle =

Tabletop role-playing game

Fifth Cycle is a fantasy role-playing game published by Shield Games in 1990.

== Publication ==
Fifth Cycle was designed by Robert Bartels and published by Shield Games in 1990 as a 198-page perfect bound book with cover art and illustrations by Michael Newbanks.

Supplements included the Fifth Cycle Gamescreen (1990), Military Races (1990) and Dark Riders (1991).

== Setting ==
Fifth Cycle is a fantasy game set on an alternate world. Four ages have come and gone (prehistory; the rise of magic; the Tyrant Mages; magic banned). Now in the Fifth Age, King Ildebrand has allowed magic once again, and desires that the ancient ruins of Dolphinia be explored by archaeologists to discover ancient magical artifacts. Players take on the roles of archaeologists sent out into the ruins.

== Gameplay ==
=== Character generation ===
A player first chooses the race of the character: humans, elves, dwarves, warrows (similar to halflings), or glynna (winged humanoids). The player rolls dice to create the standard attributes (Strength, Intelligence, etc.) The player then chooses one of the listed professions, each of which has a group of skills associated with it; the player assigns starting points to the skills as desired. A point-buy system is used for skills, with skills outside of the character's occupation and family heritage costing more. A high attribute related to a skill reduces the cost of that skill.

=== Skill resolution ===
Skills are expressed as a percentage, usually the character's skill level times five, the result added to 50%. The player trying to complete a task must roll a result on percentile dice that is equal to or lower than the character's relevant skill. If this occurs in an adversarial situation, the roll is made with a penalty of -10%.

=== Combat resolution ===
Combat has six phases:

1. Initiative
2. Glynna swooping attack
3. Magic
4. Missile
5. Melee
6. Movement

During combat, players can divide their weapon skill modifier between attack and defense as they see fit. Damage is applied to specific parts of the body, with a chance of a "special" hit, "critical" hit or "fumble". Armor and shields will reduce damage.

=== Magic ===
The rules describe 170 spells. Magic is a spell-point system, and any character can cast spells, although the point cost is higher for non-wizards.

== Reception ==
Christopher Earley reviewed Fifth Cycle in White Wolf #29 (Oct./Nov., 1991), rating it a 3 out of 5 and stated that "The one big flaw of Fifth Cycle is a lack of new direction; it won't survive by simply being an uninspired copy of the bigger FRPGs. Where it diverges from the standard it shows its best potential; such things as Withering Mages (magical tormentors for hire), Spell Trees [...] and Archaeological Charter groups (through which PCs get set up for adventuring as a respectable career) provide the character of the game, and therein lies the stuff with which to capture an audience."

In the March 1992 edition of Dragon (Issue 179), Lester Smith thought the historical background of the five ages was "the game’s most valuable asset: a solid, plausible approach to fantasy. The history explains the existence of fantasy races, the reasons for conflict among those races, the existence of dungeons to explore, and the presence of magic and treasure lying in those dungeons." Smith thought the character generation system was "fairly straightforward", and the combat rules were "simple in concept but allow for fairly complex battle resolution." He concluded that "The Fifth Cycle game is a very satisfying product. From start to finish, it projects an aura of a well-thought-out, sensible fantasy system... This is a system that I could be happy with for a long time to come."

In 2002, Fifth Cycle was one of a dozen role-playing games termed by Ron Edwards as "fantasy heartbreakers", which are as Shannon Appelcline explains, "fantasy RPG games that were designed by people who seemed to know nothing about the advancement of game design since the original productions of Dungeons & Dragons".
