= For Water-Elf Disease =

Anglo-Saxon charm and medical treatment

"For Water-Elf Disease" (Old English: Wiþ Wæterælfadle) is an Anglo-Saxon metrical charm that was intended for use in curing the "water-elf disease," which was a disease supposedly caused by elf-shot from water elves. It is written in Old English and is found in from Bald's Leechbook (10th century).

Some historians have suggested that the disease referred to may be chicken pox or dropsy (oedema). A poultice is made with many herbs and placed on the wound.

== Text ==
Translated by Dr. Ophelia Eryn Hostetter.

Gif mon biþ on wæterælfadle, þonne beoþ him þa hand-
næglas wonne and þa eagan tearige and wile locian niþer.
Do him þis to læcedome: eoforþrote, cassuc, fone nioþo-
weard, eowberge, elehtre, eolone, merscmealwan crop,
fenminte, dile, lilie, attorlaþe, polleie, marubie, docce, ellen,
felterre, wermod, streawbergean leaf, consolde; ofgeot mid
ealaþ, do hæligwæter to, sing þis gealdor ofer þriwa:

Ic benne awrat betest beadowræda,
swa benne ne burnon, ne burston,
ne fundian, ne feologan,
ne hoppettan, ne wund waxsian,
ne dolh diopian; ac him self healde halewæge,
ne ace þe þon ma, þe eorþan on eare ace.

Sing þis manegum siþum: Eorþe þe onbere eallum hire
mihtum and mægenum. þas galdor mon mæg singan on
wunde.

If someone comes down with the “water-elf-disease,” then his finger-
nails will become black and his eyes teary and will wish to look downwards.
Do this for them as a remedy: take from below carline thistle, cassock,
yewberry, lupine, elecampane, marshmallow sprout,
fen-mint, dill, lily, cock's-spur, pennyroyal, marrabulum, sorrel, elder,
felterry, wormwood, strawberry leaf, and comfrey. Soak them with
ale, then mix them with holy water, and sing this charm over it three times:

I have composed the best battle-company for this wound,
so that the wound will neither burn nor burst,
neither hurry forwards nor multiply,
neither throb in pain nor the wound grow,
nor the pain deepen—yet he may hold the hallows himself
nor shall it grow any greater, like the earth grows with ears.

Sing this many times: Earth that withers all of these,
with might and power. This spell one can sing over their
wounds.
