= Against a Wen =

Anglo-Saxon metrical charm

"Against a Wen" is an Anglo-Saxon metrical charm of 11th-century date, one of 12 surviving. It occurs in a blank space on folio 106v of Royal MS 4 A XIV, a 10th-century manuscript containing various religious texts. The target of the charm is a wen or cyst, which it addresses in the second person, commanding it to leave the affected body.

== Analysis ==
Along with eight of the other metrical charms, Felix Grendon classifies "Against a Wen" under class A, "exorcisms of diseases or disease-spirits". According to him, it belongs to a subset of exorcism charms that are "distinctly reminiscent of Heathendom", containing "numerous allusions to Heathen beliefs, customs, and practices". Analysing the charm, he writes, "This is a quaint charm, quite unlike any other in the A group: it lacks the epic passage and the heroic style characteristic of the poetic incantations. The exorcist first uses a command formula (lines 1–3), then adopts a persuasive tone in lines 4–5, only to return to another command in lines 6–7, and to a typical exorcism (lines 8–13) based on similitude [...] The passage includes a series of six similes, whose force rests on sympathy between the respective similes and the desired extinction of the wen."

== Text ==
Wið Wennum

Wenne, wenne, wenchichenne,
her ne scealt þu timbrien, ne nenne tun habben
ac þu scealt north eonene to þan nihgan berhge
þer þu hauest ermig enne broþer.
He þe sceal legge leaf et heafde
Under fot wolues, under ueþer earnes,
under earnes clea, a þu geweornie.
Clinge þu alswa col on heorþe.
Scring þu alswa scerne awage,
and weorne alswa weter on ambre.
Swa litel þu gewurþe alswa linsetcorn,
and miccli lesse alswa anes handwurmes hupeban,
and alswa litel þu gewurþe þet þu nawiht gewurþe.

Translation:
Against a Wen

Wen, wen, little wen,
Here you shall not build, nor any dwelling have,
But forth you must, even to the near-by hill,
Where a poor wretch, a brother you have;
He shall lay you a leaf at your head.
Under the wolf's foot, under the eagle's wing,
Under the eagle's claw—ever may you wither!
Shrivel as the coal upon the hearth!
Shrink as the muck in the stream,
And dwindle even as water in a pail!
May you become as little as a linseed grain,
And much smaller, likewise, than a hand-worm's hip-bone!
And even so small may you become, that you become as nought.

== Appearances in popular culture ==
The charm features in "Baldur", the 18th episode of the fifth series of Vikings, in which Queen Judith seeks the help of a witch for a breast tumour.
