= Nazgûl =

Character group from J. R. R. Tolkien's legendarium

In-universe information
- Aliases: The Nine; Úlairi (in Quenya); Black Riders; Fell Riders; Ringwraiths
- Book(s): The Fellowship of the Ring (1954), The Two Towers (1954), The Return of the King (1955), The Silmarillion (1977), Unfinished Tales (1980)

Pronunciation of the name

The Nazgûl (from Black Speech nazg 'ring', and gûl 'wraith, spirit') – introduced as Black Riders and also called Ringwraiths, Dark Riders, the Nine Riders, or simply the Nine – are fictional characters in J. R. R. Tolkien's Middle-earth. They were nine Men who had succumbed to Sauron's power through wearing Rings of Power, which gave them immortality but reduced them to invisible wraiths, servants bound to the power of the One Ring and completely under Sauron's control.

The Lord of the Rings calls them Sauron's "most terrible servants". Their leader, known as the Witch-king of Angmar, the Lord of the Nazgûl, or the Black Captain, was Sauron's chief agent for most of the Third Age. At the end of the Third Age, their main stronghold was the city of Minas Morgul at the entrance to Sauron's realm, Mordor. They dress entirely in black. In their early forays, they ride on black horses; later they ride flying monsters, which Tolkien described as "pterodactylic". Their main weapon is terror, though in their pursuit of the Ring-bearer Frodo Baggins, their leader uses a Morgul-knife which would reduce its victim to a wraith, and they carry ordinary swords. In his final battle, the Lord of the Nazgûl attacks Éowyn with a mace. The hobbit Merry Brandybuck stabs him with an ancient enchanted Númenórean blade, allowing Éowyn to kill him with her sword.

Commentators have written that the Nazgûl serve on the ordinary level of story as dangerous opponents of the Company of the Ring; at the romantic level as the enemies of the heroic protagonists; and finally at the mythic level. Tolkien knew the Lacnunga, the Old English book of spells; it may have suggested multiple features of the Nazgûl, the Witch-King, and the Morgul-knife.

The Nazgûl appear in numerous adaptations of Tolkien's writings, including animated and live-action films and computer games.

== Fictional history ==
=== Second Age ===
Those who used the Nine Rings became mighty in their day, kings, sorcerers, and warriors of old. They obtained glory and great wealth, yet it turned to their downfall. They had, as it seemed, unending life, yet life became unendurable to them. They could walk, if they would, unseen by all eyes in this world beneath the sun, and they could see things in worlds invisible to mortal men; but too often they beheld only the phantoms and delusions of Sauron. And one by one, sooner or later, according to their native strength and to the good or evil of their wills in the beginning, they fell under the thraldom of the ring that they bore and of the domination of the One which was Sauron's. And they became forever invisible save to him that wore the Ruling Ring, and they entered into the realm of shadows. The Nazgûl were they, the Ringwraiths, the Úlairi, the Enemy's most terrible servants; darkness went with them, and they cried with the voices of death.

— The Silmarillion, "Of the Rings of Power and the Third Age" (Note: Tolkien 1977, "Of the Rings of Power and the Third Age")

The Nazgûl or Ringwraiths (Quenya plural: Úlairi) first appeared in the Second Age. The Dark Lord Sauron gave nine Rings of Power to powerful mortal men, including three lords of the once-powerful island realm of Númenor, along with kings of countries in Middle-earth. (Note: Tolkien 1977, "The Akallabêth", p. 267. "Yet Sauron was ever guileful, and it is said that among those whom he ensnared with the Nine Rings three were great lords of Númenórean race.") (Note: Tolkien 1980, 4. "The Hunt for the Ring" i. "Of the Journey of the Black Riders") The rings enslaved their bearers to the power of Sauron's One Ring, into which he had put much of his own power. The corrupting effect of the Rings greatly extended the bearers' lives. (Note: Tolkien in some places stated that the Ringwraiths wore their rings, and in others that Sauron kept control by holding the rings himself: "They would have obeyed . . . any minor command of his that did not interfere with their errand — laid upon them by Sauron, who still through their nine rings (which he held) had primary control of their wills". (Note: Carpenter 2023, #246 to Mrs Eileen Elgar, September 1963) They were by far the most powerful of his servants, and the most suitable for such a mission, since they were entirely enslaved to their Nine Rings, which he now himself held. (Note: Tolkien 1980, "Journey of the Black Riders"))

The Nazgûl had a sharp sense of smell. Their sight worked differently, too: "They themselves do not see the world of light as we do, but our shapes cast shadows in their minds, which only the noon sun destroys; and in the dark they perceive many signs and forms that are hidden from us: then they are most to be feared." (Note: Tolkien 1954a book 1, ch. 11 "A Knife in the Dark") Their chief weapon was terror; it was so powerful that Sauron faced one disadvantage when using them: they could not easily travel in secret. The terror they spread was greater when they were unclad and invisible, and when they were gathered together. (Note: Tolkien 1980, 4. "The Hunt for the Ring" ii. "Other Versions of the Story")

Only two of the Nazgûl are named or identified individually in Tolkien's works. Their chief, also known as the Lord of the Nazgûl and the Black Captain, appears as the Witch-king of Angmar during the Third Age, instrumental in the destruction of the North-kingdom of Arnor. (Note: Tolkien 1955, Appendix A, 1 "The Numenorean Kings") In Unfinished Tales, his second-in-command is named as Khamûl, the "Black Easterling" or the "Shadow of the East". (Note: Tolkien 1980, Index, entry for Khamûl) Three of the Nazgûl were great Númenórean lords; in his notes for translators, Tolkien speculated that the Witch-king of Angmar, ruler of a northern kingdom with its capital at Carn Dûm, was of Númenórean origin. (Note: Tolkien writes: "the name and origin of the Witch-king is not recorded, but he was probably of Númenórean descent." Hammond, Wayne G. & Scull, Christina, The Lord of the Rings: A Reader's Companion, p. 20. Tolkien later removed the passage; it does not appear in the version in Jared Lobdell's A Tolkien Compass.)

The Nine soon became Sauron's principal servants. (Note: Tolkien 1955, Appendix B, "The Tale of Years", entries in "The Second Age") They were dispersed after the first overthrow of Sauron late in the Second Age at the hands of the Last Alliance of Elves and Men, but their survival was assured by the power of the One Ring.

=== Third Age ===
The Nazgûl re-emerge over a thousand years later in the Third Age, when the Lord of the Nazgûl leads Sauron's forces against the successor kingdoms of Arnor: Rhudaur, Cardolan, and Arthedain. He destroys all three but is defeated by the armies of Gondor and the Elf-lord Glorfindel, who prophesies that "not by the hand of man will he fall". (Note: Tolkien 1955, Appendix A, I, iv "Gondor and the heirs of Anarion") He escapes, and returns to Mordor. There, he gathers the other Nazgûl to prepare for the return of Sauron. (Note: Tolkien 1955, Appendix B, "The Tale of Years", entries in "The Third Age")

The Nazgûl besiege Minas Ithil, a Gondorian fortress in the Ephel Duath, capture it, and acquire its palantír for Sauron. The city becomes Minas Morgul, the Nazgûl's stronghold, and the valley is known as Morgul Vale (Imlad Morgul). Sauron returns from Dol Guldur to Mordor and declares himself openly. (Note: Tolkien 1954a, book 2, ch. 2 "The Council of Elrond") He sent two or three of the Nazgûl, led by Khamul, to garrison Dol Guldur.

Sauron learns from Gollum that a hobbit, Bilbo Baggins of the Shire, has acquired the One Ring. (Note: Tolkien 1954a, book 1, ch. 2 "The Shadow of the Past") Sauron entrusts its recovery to the Nazgûl. They reappear "west of the River", riding black horses that were bred or trained in Mordor to endure their terror. They learn that the Ring has passed to Bilbo's heir, Frodo, and hunt him and his companions across the Shire; the hobbits hear snuffling, and sometimes see them crawling. (Note: Tolkien 1954a book 1, ch. 3 "Three is Company") (Note: Tolkien 1954a book 1, ch. 4 "A Short Cut to Mushrooms") The hobbits escape, via Tom Bombadil's realm where they are not pursued, to Bree. (Note: Tolkien 1954a book 1, ch. 6 "The Old Forest") (Note: Tolkien 1954a book 1, ch. 7 "In the House of Tom Bombadil") (Note: Tolkien 1954a book 1, ch. 8 "Fog on the Barrow-downs") A Ranger of the North, Aragorn, arrives ahead of them and for some days leads them on paths not closely followed by the Ringwraiths. (Note: Tolkien 1954a book 1, ch. 9 "At the Sign of the Prancing Pony") (Note: Tolkien 1954a book 1, ch. 10 "Strider")

Five of the Nazgûl corner Frodo and his company at Weathertop, where the Witch-king stabs Frodo in the shoulder with the Morgul-knife, breaking off a piece of it in the Hobbit's flesh. During their assault, they mentally command Frodo to put on the One Ring; while wearing it, he sees them as pale figures robed in white, with "haggard hands", helmets and swords. The Witch-king was taller than the others, with "long and gleaming" hair and a crown on his helmet.

When all Nine are swept away by the waters of the river Bruinen, their horses are drowned, and the Ringwraiths are forced to return to Mordor to regroup. (Note: Tolkien 1954a book 1, ch. 12 "Flight to the Ford") The nine members of the Company of the Ring, tasked with the destruction of the Ring, leave Rivendell as the "Nine Walkers", in opposition to the Nazgûl, the "Nine Riders". (Note: Tolkien 1954a book 2, ch. 3 "The Ring Goes South")

The Nazgûl came again ... like vultures that expect their fill of doomed men's flesh. Out of sight and shot they flew, and yet were ever present, and their deadly voices rent the air. More unbearable they became, not less, at each new cry. At length even the stout-hearted would fling themselves to the ground as the hidden menace passed over them, or they would stand, letting their weapons fall from nerveless hands while into their minds a blackness came, and they thought no more of war, but only of hiding and of crawling, and of death.

— The Return of the King, "The Siege of Gondor" (Note: Tolkien 1955, book 5, ch. 4 "The Siege of Gondor")

The Nazgûl reappear mounted on hideous flying beasts. (Note: Tolkien 1955, book 5, ch. 6, "The Battle of the Pelennor Fields") (Note: Carpenter 2023, #211 to Rhona Beare, 14 October 1958) During the Battle of the Pelennor Fields, the Lord of the Nazgûl uses magic, including Grond, a battering-ram engraved with evil spells, to break the gates of Minas Tirith. He is faced by Éowyn, a noblewoman of Rohan; and not far away, Merry, a hobbit of the Company. Éowyn boldly calls the Nazgûl a "dwimmerlaik", telling him to go if he is not deathless. (Note: "Dwimmerlaik" represents a word in Rohirric, the speech of Rohan, translated into Old English; Tolkien glosses it in the index as a "work of necromancy", a "spectre". It derives from Old English (ge)dwimor, "phantom, illusion" and -leikr, the Old Norse ending corresponding to Anglo-Saxon -lac, meaning "a state or act". (Note: Tolkien 1990, p. 372) Tom Shippey writes that Tolkien borrowed the word from a Middle English poem, Layamon's Brut.) He casts back his hood to reveal a crown, but the head that wears it is invisible. Merry's surreptitious stroke with an enchanted Barrow-blade brings the Nazgûl to his knees, allowing Éowyn, the niece of Théoden, to drive her sword between his crown and mantle. Thus is the Witch-king destroyed by a woman and a Hobbit, fulfilling Glorfindel's prophecy. Both weapons that pierced him disintegrate, and both assailants are stricken with the Black Breath.

After the fall of the Lord of the Nazgûl, command of Mordor's army in the field falls to Gothmog, the "lieutenant of Morgul", of unspecified race. (Note: Wayne G. Hammond and Christina Scull comment that fans' suggestions that Gothmog was a Nazgûl are "no more than speculation". They note that an earlier Gothmog was "Lord of Balrogs", who killed Fëanor and Fingon, and was killed in the assault on Gondolin. They note also that "lieutenant of Morgul" could mean the second-in-command either of Minas Morgul or "more likely" of the Morgul-lord, the Lord of the Nazgûl.) (Note: Tolkien 1955, book 5, ch. 6, "The Battle of the Pelennor Fields". "There they had been mustered for the sack of the City and the rape of Gondor, waiting on the call of their Captain. He now was destroyed; but Gothmog the lieutenant of Morgul had flung them into the fray...")

The remaining eight Ringwraiths attack the Army of the West during the Battle of the Morannon. (Note: Tolkien 1955, book 5, ch. 10 "The Black Gate Opens") When Frodo claims the Ring for his own in Mount Doom, Sauron, finally realizing his peril, orders the remaining eight Nazgûl to fly to intercept him. They arrive too late: Gollum seizes the Ring and falls into the Cracks of Doom, destroying the Ring. That ends Sauron's power and everything he had brought into being using it, including the Nazgûl. (Note: Tolkien 1955 book 6, ch. 3, "Mount Doom")

== Steeds ==
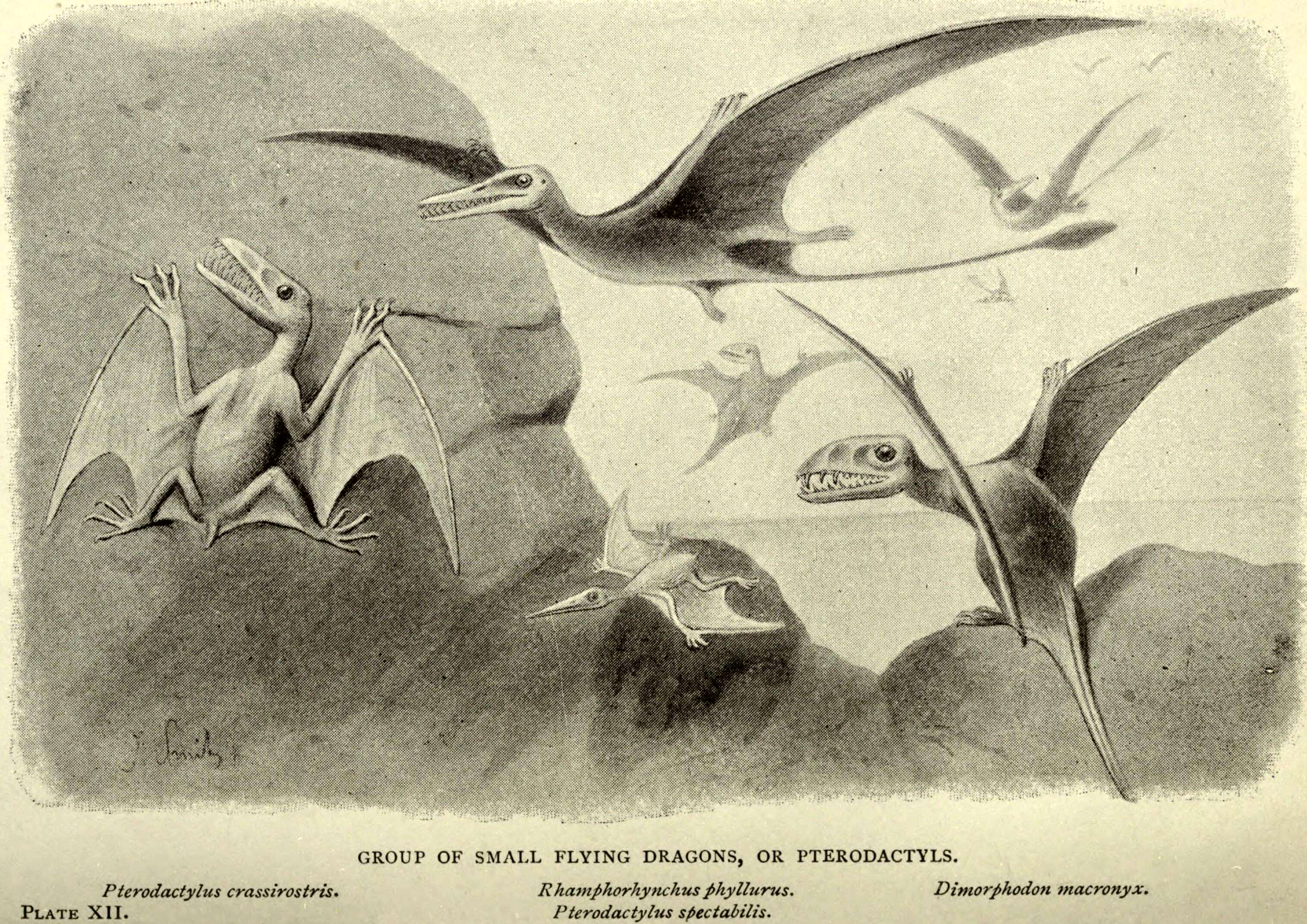
Tolkien stated that the "fell beasts" that the Nazgûl rode, while not intended actually to be pterodactyls, were "obviously ... pterodactylic". 1897 reconstruction of pterodactyls shown

The flying steeds of the Nazgûl are given various descriptions but no name. The soldier of Gondor Beregond calls them "Hell Hawks". Tolkien describes them as "fell beasts", though he also applies the adjective fell ("fierce, cruel") to other creatures throughout The Lord of the Rings – even at one point to the wizard Gandalf. In a letter, he calls the winged mounts "Nazgûl-birds". (Note: Carpenter 2023, #100 to Christopher Tolkien, 29 May 1945, expressing his "loathing" for the Royal Air Force: "My sentiments are more or less those that Frodo would have had if he discovered some Hobbits learning to ride Nazgûl-birds, 'for the liberation of the Shire'.") In the absence of a proper name, derivative works sometimes press "fellbeast" or "fell-beast" into service.

In the Battle of the Pelennor Fields, where the Lord of the Nazgûl rode one of the flying beasts against King Théoden of Rohan, his mount is described as:

a winged creature: if bird, then greater than all other birds, and it was naked, and neither quill nor feather did it bear, and its vast pinions were as webs of hide between horned fingers; and it stank. A creature of an older world maybe it was ...

It is said to attack with "beak and claw". Tolkien wrote that he "did not intend the steed of the Witch-king to be what is now called a 'pterodactyl'", while acknowledging "obviously it is pterodactylic" and owed much to the "new ... mythology" [of the "Prehistoric"], and might even be "a last survivor of older geological eras."

The medievalist Marjorie Burns compares the fell beast to the Poetic Edda's flying steed Sleipnir, "Odin's eight-legged otherworldly horse". She writes that whereas Gandalf's horse Shadowfax resembles Sleipnir in his miraculous speed and in almost seeming to fly, the Nazgûl's mount actually flies but is a "negative image" of Odin's steed; and, she notes, both Odin and the Nazgûl can cause blindness.

== Concept and creation ==
=== Development ===
Tolkien began writing The Lord of the Rings with no conception of Black Riders at all. The horseman in dark clothes in the early chapter "Three is Company" was originally Gandalf; in 1938, Tolkien called the figure's transformation into a Black Rider "an unpremeditated turn". (Note: Carpenter 2023, #26 to Stanley Unwin, 4 March 1938) Frodo's ring, too, was simply a magic ring conferring invisibility, both in The Hobbit and early drafts of The Lord of the Rings, with no link to Sauron. However, Tolkien was at the time starting to consider the true nature of the Ring, and the idea that it had been made by the Necromancer, and drew itself or its bearer back to him. The Black Riders became Ringwraiths when the hobbit, at that time called Bingo rather than Frodo, discussed the Riders with the Elf Gildor, later in the same chapter. Over the next three years, Tolkien gradually developed the connections between the Nazgûl, the One Ring, Sauron, and all the other Rings of Power. The pieces finally all came together when Tolkien wrote "The Mirror of Galadriel", some hundreds of pages later, around the autumn of 1941. (Note: Tolkien 1954a, book 2, ch. 7 "The Mirror of Galadriel") (Note: Tolkien 1989, pp. 259–260)

=== Medieval origins ===
The number of the Nazgûl, nine, may be derived from medieval folklore. Edward Pettit, in Mallorn, states that nine is "the commonest 'mystic' number in Germanic lore". He quotes the "Nine Herbs Charm" from the Lacnunga, an Old English book of spells:

against venom and vile things
and all the loathly ones,
that through the land rove,
...
against nine fugitives from glory,
against nine poisons and
against nine flying diseases.

Pettit further proposes that Tolkien may have made multiple uses of another Lacnunga charm, "Against a sudden stabbing pain", to derive multiple attributes of the Nazgûl. He states that Tolkien certainly knew the charm. In Henry Sweet's translation:

They were loud, lo, loud, when they rode over the hill,
They were resolute when they rode over the land.
...
If a piece of iron is in here.
The work of a witch, heat shall melt it!
...
If it were shot of gods, or if it were shot of elves,
Or if it were shot of witch, now I will help you.

Pettit writes that Tolkien may have used the "loud" riders to come up with the "thundering hooves" and "piercing cry" of the Nine Riders. The supernatural beings mentioned in the charm – gods, elves, witches – may naturally have suggested the Nazgûl's magical power; in particular, the "work of a witch" may have resulted in the Witch-king of Angmar. Finally, the Morgul-knife that breaks off in the victim's body, and which Elrond has to destroy by melting, matches the "piece of iron ... in here... heat shall melt it!"

=== Etymological connotations ===
Tolkien was a philologist. Jason Fisher, writing that "all stories begin with words", takes up Edmund Wilson's "denigrating dismissal" of The Lord of the Rings as "a philological curiosity", replying that to him this is "precisely one of its greatest strengths". Fisher explores in detail the connotations of Tolkien's use of "Ringwraith" and its Black Speech translation "Nazgûl", both in languages that Tolkien knew and those that he invented. "Wraith" in modern English means 'spectre'. Fisher notes that the word has a history in folktale and fantasy including usage by the Brothers Grimm, William Morris, and George MacDonald. The word "wraith" can be connected, Fisher writes, to English "writhe", Old English wrīþan, to bend or twist, and in turn to Gothic wraiqs, curved, crooked, or winding, and wraks, a persecutor. There is also English "wreath", from Old English wrida, meaning a band, a thing wound around something, and indeed a ring. Another cognate is Old Saxon wred, meaning cruel; Fisher comments that all of these stem from Indo-European *wreit, to turn, bend, or wind.

"Nazgûl" has the Black Speech roots nazg, ring, and gûl, wraith. Fisher writes that the former may well be connected, unconsciously on Tolkien's part, to Gaelic nasc, a ring. Gûl has the meaning "magic" in Tolkien's invented language of Sindarin. Fisher comments that this has an English homophone in "ghoul", a wraith, which derives from Arabic غُول ḡūl, a demon that feeds on corpses. The Sindarin word is related to ñgol, wise, wisdom, and to Noldor, Fëanor's elves who became in Fisher's words "bent and twisted" by the desire for the Silmarils.

Diagram of Jason Fisher's analysis of philological connections and etymologies of Nazgûl and Ringwraith. Both terms have connotations of being "bent and twisted".

The only one of the nine Ringwraiths to be named is Khamûl. Fisher suggests a link to Welsh kam, crooked, and kamy, to bend. "Kam" made its way into English usage, including by Shakespeare, as is recorded in Samuel Johnson's 1755 A Dictionary of the English Language. Fisher writes that this may have come to Tolkien by way of his time with the Lancashire Fusiliers in the First World War, with Lancashire dialect words like caimt, crooked or bad-tempered. In short, Tolkien may have felt many philological associations between his "Nazgûl" and "Ringwraith" with the meanings of being bent and twisted as well as ghoulish.

== Analysis ==
=== Literary modes ===
Shippey writes that the Nazgûl function at different stylistic levels or modes (as categorised by Northrop Frye in his Anatomy of Criticism) in the story. At one level, they serve simply as story elements, dangerous opponents. But, Shippey notes, the level rises from the romantic, with heroes taking on the Black Riders, to the mythic, giving as example the assault of Minas Tirith. The leader of the Nazgûl directs the attack on the Great Gate; he bursts the gate using both the battering-ram Grond, written with "spells of ruin", and with "words of power and terror to rend both heart and stone". (Note: Tolkien 1955, book 5, ch. 4, "The Siege of Gondor")

=== Invisible, but corporeal ===
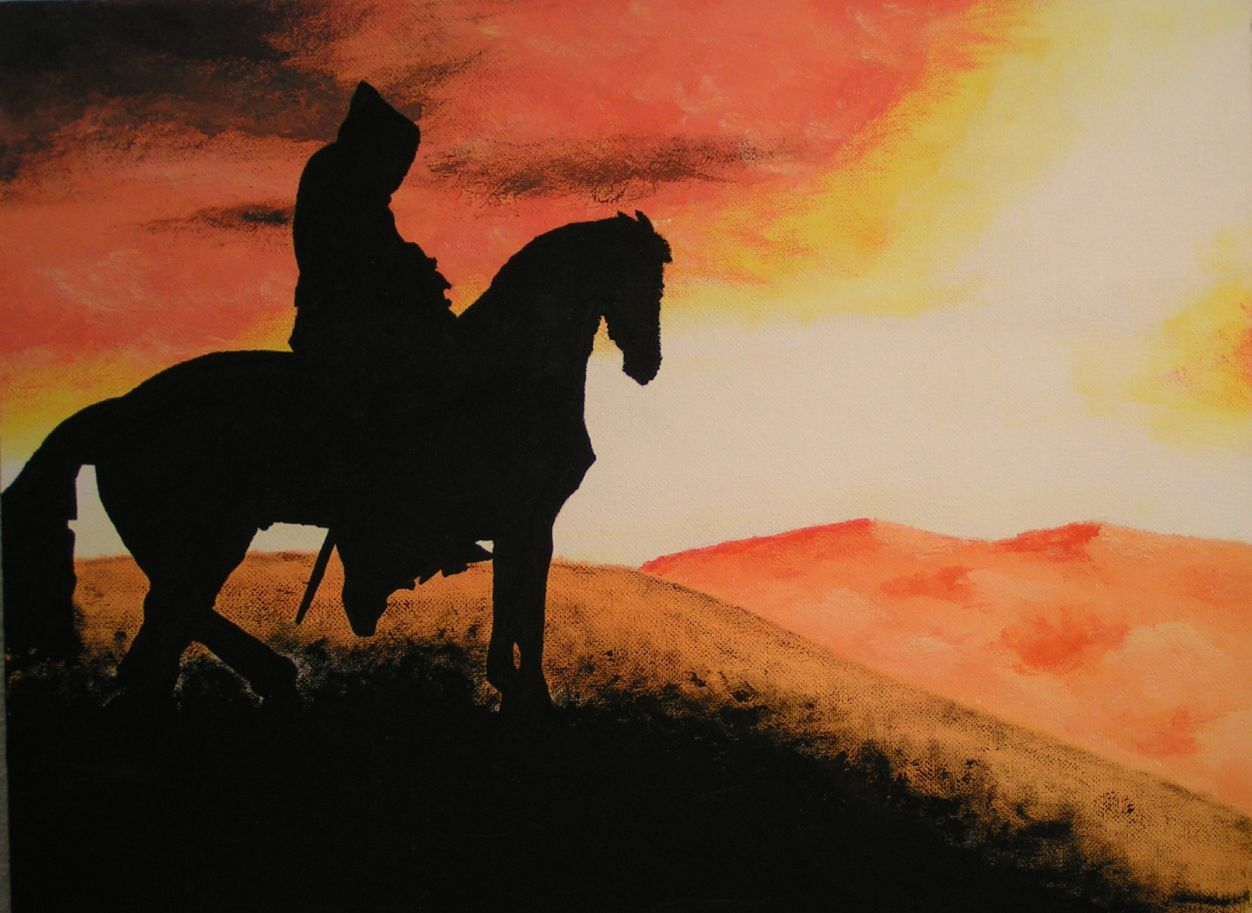
A Nazgûl, depicted as a shadowy but solid body, cloaked and hooded, wearing a sword, and mounted on a horse

Despite his shadowiness and invisibility, Shippey writes, the Nazgûl on the Pelennor Fields also comes as close as he ever does to seeming human, having human form inside his black robes, carrying a sword, and laughing to reveal his power when he throws back his hood, revealing a king's crown on his invisible head.

Yvette Kisor, a scholar of literature, writes that while the Ringwraiths and others (like Frodo) who wear Rings of Power become invisible, they do not lose any of their corporeality, being present as physical bodies. They require, she writes, physical steeds to carry them about, and they can wield swords. She notes that only a person in a body can wield the One Ring, so the invisibility is just "a trick of sight". When Frodo, wearing the Ring, saw the Nazgûl in the "twilight world", they appeared solid, not shadowy. He also saw Glorfindel in that world, as a figure of white flame; and Gandalf explains later that the Ringwraiths were "dismayed" to see "an Elf-lord revealed in his wrath". (Note: Tolkien 1954a, book 2, ch. 1 "Many Meetings") Frodo is in danger of "fading" permanently into invisibility and the twilight world, as the Ringwraiths have done, living "in another mode of reality". She writes, too, that Merry's sword, with the special power to sever the Witch-king's "undead flesh" and in particular to overcome the "spell that knit his unseen sinews to his will", has in fact to cut through real, but invisible, sinews and flesh.

=== Gradual incarnation ===
Steve Walker, a Tolkien scholar, writes that the story gives the Ringwraiths credibility through a "gradual incarnation of bodiless presence". Little by little, in his view, Tolkien increases the reader's insight into their nature, starting with Black Riders who are "spies more human than diabolical", rather than developing their character. Walker sees this as appropriate: the Nazgûl's main weapons are psychological, namely fear and despair. He writes that the progressive revelation of their capabilities, and their "escalation of steeds" from horses to fell beasts, builds up in the reader's mind an "increasingly infernal vision".

=== Black Breath ===
The Nazgûl spread terror and despair among their enemies, and discomfit those on their own side. The Black Breath is stated to have afflicted many during the Battle of the Pelennor Fields. Dr Jennifer Urquart, writing in Mallorn, describes its normal course as "progressive loss of consciousness and hypothermia, leading to death". She comments that the Black Breath, contracted by "excessive proximity" to a Nazgûl, seems to be a "spiritual malady" combined with "fear, confusion, reduced levels of consciousness, hypothermia, weakness and death." Faramir, on the other hand, who was thought to be suffering from the Black Breath, she diagnoses as most likely exhaustion with heat stroke, combined with "psychological distress" and pain, as his symptoms were quite different. Judy Ann Ford and Robin Anne Reid note that Aragorn's use of the herb athelas to heal Faramir and others of the Black Breath, a condition "which harms the spirit more than the body", identifies him to his people as the true King.

Michael and Victoria Wodzak discuss how the hobbit Merry Brandybuck can be affected by the Black Breath when the Witch-king has not noticed him, pointing out that Tolkien nowhere says that the Nazgûl breathes on him or on Éowyn. Instead Éowyn "raised her shield against the horror of her enemy's eye", and the Wodzaks comment that the Nazgûl uses his eyes "to overwhelm". In their view, the seeming inconsistency is resolved by identifying the Black Breath with his "pneuma", his evil spirit, and assuming that it is this which causes the harm all around him.

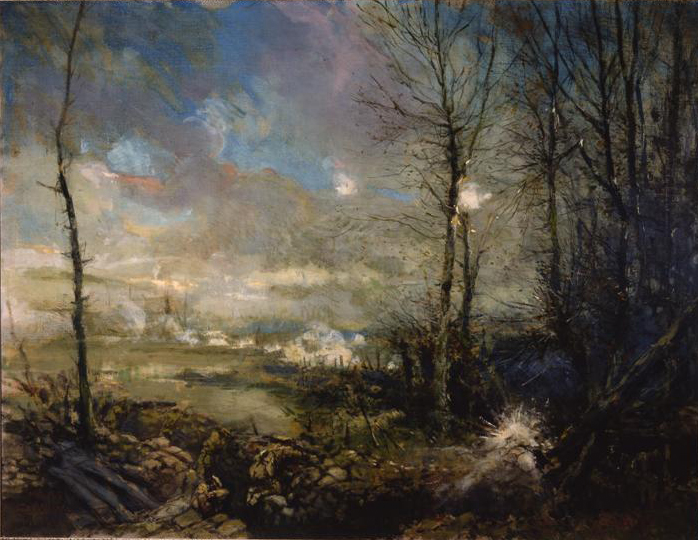
John Garth suggests that the Black Breath may derive from Tolkien's experience of gas in the First World War. Painting Gas Attack, Flanders by Alfred Bastien, 1915

Tolkien's biographer John Garth finds Christopher Gilson's Words, Phrases and Passages in Various Tongues in "The Lord of the Rings" especially interesting for its rendering of two of the Dark Lord Sauron's epithets, Thû meaning "horrible darkness, black mist" and Gorthu meaning "mist of fear". Garth comments that these names "anchor him in the primal night" of Tolkien's giant spiders, the Black Breath, the fog on the Barrow-downs, and the terror of the Paths of the Dead. He adds that this fog of terror may ultimately derive from Tolkien's First World War experience "of smoke barrages, gas attacks and 'animal horror' on the Somme." Earlier, in his 2003 book Tolkien and the Great War, on the other hand, Garth merely notes the "Black Breath of despair that brings down even the bravest" as one of several elements of The Lord of the Rings which "suggest[s] the influence of 1914–18".

In her Tolkienesque 1961 short story "The Jewel of Arwen", the fantasy and science fiction writer Marion Zimmer Bradley provides "Translator's Notes" which assert as part of her frame story that the Nazgûl were contaminated and enslaved by a monstrous form of radioactivity which transformed "the very cells of their protoplasm". They thereby became radioactive and "immune to radiation poisoning, as is shown by their dwelling in the blasted tower of Minas Ithil [which glowed in the dark]." Further, Bradley writes, the Nazgûl gave off "radioactive contamination", causing the Black Breath.

=== Opposed to the Nine Walkers ===
Nine Walkers vs Nine Riders: diagram of Ariel Little's analysis of the enslaved Nine Nazgûl opposed by the free Company of the Ring. Tolkien made the two groups match in number but sharply different in character.

The Inklings scholar Ariel Little writes that Tolkien explicitly opposes the enslaved Nine Riders with the Nine Walkers, the free Company of the Ring. In "The Council of Elrond", Elrond announces that "The Company of the Ring shall be Nine; and the Nine Walkers shall be set against the Nine Riders that are evil". Little describes the Nazgûl as "homogeneous, discordant, intensely individualistic", a group bound and trapped by Sauron, noting also Gandalf's description of them in "The Shadow of the Past" as "Mortal Men, proud and great [who] fell under the dominion of the One, and they became Ringwraiths, shadows under his great Shadow, his most terrible servants". They had thus, Little writes, lost their identities as humans, even losing their substance and becoming what Tolkien calls "nothingness" under their black clothing. He adds that the evil characters in The Lord of the Rings are characterised by infighting, as among the Orcs, lack of harmony, and "hate-filled discord", forming an "anti-community".

Little contrasts this disharmony with the Company of the Ring, which is "diverse, bound by friendship, relying on each other's strengths". The Company is joined by its common purpose, and by "devoted love". There are strong bonds of friendship, seen initially between all the Hobbits. Further friendships develop throughout the Company as they travel together; Little notes that Frodo says that "Strider" (Aragorn), viewed initially with suspicion, is "dear to me". He comments that "the deep affection of the Fellowship breaks down racial and cultural barriers" as all its members drop their initial reserve and come to an "appreciation for the cultural distinctiveness" of their companions. A case in point is the strong friendship between the Dwarf Gimli and the Elf Legolas, members of two races with radically dissimilar cultures, and which had often clashed in the past; Little notes that even the other members of the Company, in Tolkien's words, "wonder ... at this change". He writes that even when the Company splits up into smaller groups, it is not destroyed: far from it, Frodo and Sam sustain each other through their arduous journey, their friendship deepening with time; Merry and Pippin supporting each other; Aragorn, Legolas, and Gimli acting as a team, all continuing to function as communities. Little adds that the Company functions as a true team, every member being essential to the success of its mission. The Christian commentator Ralph C. Wood writes that "the greatness of the Nine Walkers lies in the modesty of both their abilities and accomplishments. Their strength lies in their weakness, in their solidarity as a company unwilling to wield controlling power over others." Rebecca Munro notes that in the Company, "no one acts alone without dependence on the deeds of others".

== Adaptations ==
=== Films ===
The Nazgûl hacking and slashing at the hobbits' beds in the Prancing Pony inn at Bree, in Ralph Bakshi's 1978 animated film version

The Nazgûl are featured in adaptations of The Lord of the Rings on radio, film, and stage. In Ralph Bakshi's 1978 animated film version of The Lord of the Rings, the Nazgûl "shamble and limp like zombies". They hack and slash the Hobbits' beds at The Prancing Pony inn, whereas Tolkien does not identify the assailants. (Note: Tolkien 1954a, book 1, ch. 10, "Strider")

A Nazgûl portrayed in Peter Jackson's The Lord of the Rings film trilogy

In the Rankin-Bass adaptation of The Return of the King, the Nazgûl are robed skeletons with white hair. They ride winged horses, although the Witch-king rides a creature more in line with the book when he confronts Éowyn. The 1981 BBC Radio serial of The Lord of the Rings has the Nazgûl chant the Ring-inscription in the Black Speech of Mordor. The 1991 Russian television play Khraniteli features a group of Nazgûl galloping through a snowy pine forest; they wear black cloaks, with glimpses of red equipment.

In The Lord of the Rings film trilogy (2001–2003) by Peter Jackson, the Nazgûl are almost always concealed by cloaks; they attack the inn at Bree themselves. During the siege of Minas Tirith, the Witch-king wears a distinctive helmet over his hood resembling a mask and a crown, rather than the crown worn underneath his hood in the book. Their shrieks are distorted recordings of producer and screenwriter Fran Walsh's scream.

John Howe's illustration of the Witch-king's flying steed drove the design of the monsters in Peter Jackson's films.

Minas Morgul is shown first in The Fellowship of the Ring, when the Nazgûl leave the city and ride towards the Shire to pursue the One Ring. It features again when Frodo and Sam make their way towards Cirith Ungol. These sets were designed by the illustrator John Howe. All nine Nazgûl are shown riding winged monsters. Jackson's monsters explicitly differ from Tolkien's description in that they have teeth instead of beaks. The Nazgûl use them in battle more extensively than in the book. In the film the Witch-king's mount is largely responsible for the death of Théoden and his horse Snowmane, a departure from the book. As confirmed in the films' audio commentary, the design of the monsters was based largely on illustrations by John Howe.

The fan-made 2009 film The Hunt for Gollum features Aragorn fighting a Ringwraith on the borders of Mirkwood.

In Jackson's 2012–2014 The Hobbit film trilogy, the men who became the Nazgûl are said to have been buried and sealed within the invented High Fells of Rhudaur. In the first film, Radagast briefly encounters the Witch-king while investigating Dol Guldur, and gives the Nazgûl's Morgul dagger to Gandalf to present at the White Council as proof of their return. In the second film, at Galadriel's behest, Gandalf heads to the High Fells and finds that all the Nazgûl have left the tomb. This confirms the Necromancer's identity as Sauron, as the Nazgûl appear alongside their master in the third film in spectral forms wearing Morgul armour and fight Elrond and Saruman before being driven away by Galadriel.

=== Television ===
The Nazgûl will appear in the third season of The Lord of the Rings: The Rings of Power. They will be called "Nazgnagôl" ("Ring-servants" in Black Speech) prior to their transformation into wraiths.

=== Games ===
The Nazgûl are featured in the video game Middle-earth: Shadow of Mordor and its sequel Middle-earth: Shadow of War. In the latter, Isildur is revealed to be one of the Nazgûl before he is killed by the game's protagonist, Talion. Talion takes Isildur's ring to prolong his life and eventually becomes Isildur's replacement until the demise of the Nazgûl in the Return of the King. For the expansion to its real-time strategy game The Lord of the Rings: The Battle for Middle-earth II, The Rise of the Witch-king, Electronic Arts invented the name Morgomir for one of the Nazgûl.

== Influence ==
The fantasy novelist George R. R. Martin's 1983 The Armageddon Rag tells the tale of a rock promoter who had managed a band named the Nazgûl, and was found ritually murdered on the 10th anniversary of the band's breakup.
