= Wið færstice =

Curative Anglo-Saxon charms

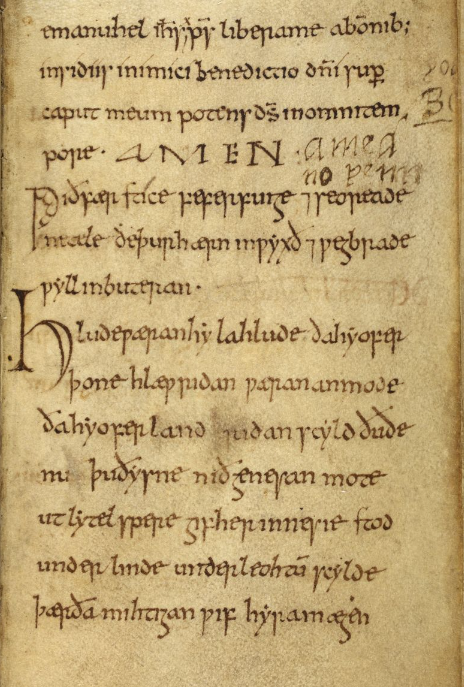
First page of the Wið fǣrstice charm, from the Lacnunga collection

Wið fǣrstice is an Old English medical text surviving in the collection known now as Lacnunga in the British Library. Wið fǣrstiċe [wiθ ˈfæːrˌsti.t͡ʃe] means 'against a sudden/violent stabbing pain'; and according to Felix Grendon, whose collection of Anglo-Saxon charms appeared in the Journal of American Folklore in 1908, "the charm is intended to cure a sudden twinge or stitch, possibly rheumatism that can be due to being shot by witches, elves, and other spirits that fly through the air." Scholars have often sought to identify this as rheumatism, but other possibilities should not be excluded. The remedy describes how to make a salve, but its main interest lies in the unique charm which follows. This describes how the færstice has been caused by the projectiles of 'mighty women' (ða mihtigan wif), whom the healer will combat. The charm also mentions elves, believed responsible for elfshot, and provides the only attestation outside personal names of the Old English form of the name of the old Germanic gods, known as the Æsir in Norse mythology.

As with many old Anglo-Saxon charms, it is presumed that physical gestures were intended to accompany the recitation of the text. In this case, the Wið færstice is intended to be accompanied by boiling feverfew, red dead-nettle grown in grain, and plantain, then boiling it all in a bowl of butter. A knife is dipped into the potion and then rubbed against the source of pain. Despite the popular use of these herbs in forms of remedial healing, the use of these plants may have been more symbolic than practical. Many old Anglo-Saxon charms draw upon the symbolism of both pagan traditions as well as ancient Christian traditions, and the use of plants in the texts were likely related to these religious references.

== Content ==
The first seventeen lines of the "Wið færstice" have been referred to as its "epic introduction". Howell D. Chickering Junior expressed the view that there "probably is no epic or mythic narrative" behind this introductory section, instead arguing that it should be seen as "a dramatic verbal performance". As edited and translated by Alaric Hall, the text runs:

Hlūde wǣran hȳ lā hlūde ðā hȳ ofer þone hlǣw ridan
wǣran ānmōde ðā hȳ ofer land ridan
scyld ðū ðē nū þū ðysne nīð genesan mōte
ūt lȳtel spere gif hēr inne sīe
stōd under linde under lēohtum scylde
þǣr ðā mihtigan wīf hyra mægen berǣddon
⁊ hȳ gyllende gāras sændan
ic him ōðerne eft wille sændan
flēogende flāne forane tōgēanes
ūt lȳtel spere gif hit hēr inne sȳ ·
sæt smið slōh seax
lȳtel īserna wund swīðe
ūt lȳtel spere gif hēr inne sȳ
syx smiðas sǣtan wælspera worhtan
ūt spere næs in spere
gif hēr inne sȳ īsenes dǣl
hægtessan geweorc hit sceal gemyltan
gif ðū wǣre on fell scoten oððe wǣre on flǣsc scoten
oððe wǣre on blōd scoten
oððe wǣre on lið scoten nǣfre ne sȳ ðīn līf ātǣsed
gif hit wǣre ēsa gescot oððe hit wǣre ylfa gescot
oððe hit wǣre hægtessan gescot nū ic wille ðīn helpan
þis ðē tō bōte ēsa gescotes ðis ðē tō bōte ylfa gescotes
ðis ðē tō bōte hægtessan gescotes ic ðīn wille helpan
flēo [?MS fled] þǣr on fyrgenhǣfde
hāl westū helpe ðīn drihten
nim þonne þæt seax ādō on wǣtan ·

Translation:

They were loud, yes, loud, when they rode over the (burial) mound;
they were fierce when they rode across the land.
Shield yourself now, you can survive this strife.
Out, little spear, if there is one here within.
It stood under/behind lime-wood (i.e. a shield), under a light-coloured/light-weight shield,
where those mighty women marshalled their powers,
and ?they sent shrieking spears.
I will send another back,
a flying arrow ahead in opposition.
Out, little spear, if it is here within.
A craftsman sat, forged a knife/knives;
?small as swords go, violent the wound.
Out, little spear, if it should be here within.
Six craftsmen sat, wrought slaughter-spears.
Be out, spear, not in, spear.
If there is here within a piece of iron/swords,
the work/deed of hægtessan, it must melt.
If you were shot/pained in the skin or were shot/pained in the flesh,
or were shot/pained in the blood,
or were shot/pained in the limb (?joint), may your life never be harmed.
If it was the shot/pain of ēse or it was the shot/pain of ælfe
or it was the shot/pain of hægtessan, now I want to (?will) help you.
This for you as a remedy for the shot/pain of ēse; this for you as a remedy for the shot/pain of ælfe,
this for you as a remedy for the shot/pain of hægtessan; I will help you.
Fly around there on the mountain top.
Be healthy, may the Lord help you.
Then take the knife; put it in (the) liquid.

== Date ==
The age of "Wið færstice" has been hard to judge. Considering all of the available evidence, Medieval literature specialist Alaric Hall deemed it probable that the charm was a "cultural artefact" from the late tenth century.

== Interpretation ==
"Scholars have debated issues of interpretation for decades, usually proceeding from the assumption that the charm rehearses one or more themes from mythology. Is the smith Weland? Are the mighty women valkyries or witches? Are the loud riders valkyries or the Wild Hunt?"

— Stephen Pollington, 2000.

Early examinations of the Anglo-Saxon poetic charms were largely focused on determining which elements within them derived from the pre-Christian belief systems of the Anglo-Saxons. Accordingly, attention was paid to "Wið færstice", which was deemed to be "one of the three or four charms apparently richest in pagan references." With the exception of the closing benediction, the charm lacks any obvious Christian references, with Jolly accordingly believing that from modern understandings of Christianity, it would seem "overwhelmingly not Christian". She however cautioned against viewing it as either non-Christian on the one hand, or as pagan on the other. She highlighted that the presumed pagan elements within it all reflected "areligious folklore, transferable from one religious tradition to another", while it was produced by people living in Late Anglo-Saxon England who would have considered themselves to be Christian and who felt no need to highly Christianise it.

=== Medical perspective ===
It is not known what medical symptom the Old English term færstice refers to in this charm. Several scholars to have studied the charm, such as Godfrid Storms and Howell D. Chickering Jr., expressed the view that it referred to rheumatism. Although noting that prior interpretations of the charm had suggested that the færstice referred to rheumatism or lumbago, the Anglo-Saxonist Stephen Pollington opined that there were "no compelling reasons" to accept either explanation, instead expressing the view that it should be regarded as a reference to "any sharp, unexpected pain".

=== Supernatural elements ===
Hall was of the view that "Wið færstice" "constructs a strong distinction between in-group (the patient and healer) and harmful out-group (the supernatural beings)."

Hall expressed the view that the poem "provides a key to interpreting the cultural significance of ælfe in medieval texts". Given his argument that in "earlier Anglo-Saxon beliefs", ælfe were "probably primarily or only male", he considered it interesting that in this charm they are cited alongside the female hægtessan.

=== Parallels and analogues ===
Hall identified an earlier parallel in Aldhelm's poetic Carmen de virginitate, specifically the passage in lines 2635–42 in which he describes Allecto, one of the Furiae of Classical mythology. In this passage, Allecto is described as bringing "iron-tipped spears to battle, which would cause jagged wounds to holy souls". Hall noted that this use of iron-tipped spears could not have been adopted straight from Classical sources, where Allecto and the Furies cause harm using snakes rather than spears. Rather, he compared the use of the Furies' spears to the spears of the hægtesse in "Wið færstice", bolstering this connection by noting that in the eighth century Third Cleopatra Glossary, the Latin word furiarum is given the Old English gloss of hægtessa.

Hall also argued that there was a "remarkable parallel" between "Wið færstice" and the accounts of magical practices provided by Isobel Gowdie, a Scottish woman accused of witchcraft in 1662, during her confessions. Gowdie claimed that she rode through the air on straw with her fellow witches, firing "elf-arrows" at her victims; these had been acquired from the Devil, who had been aided in their creation by "Elf-boyes". Hall stated that this exhibited a general similarity to the account provided in "Wið færstice". He also thought there were parallels between the two accounts in terms of their use of smiths; in both, one smith (the Devil in Gowdie's account) is part of a wider group of smiths. While acknowledging "the great gap of time" – lasting around seven centuries – between the two accounts, Hall noted that "charm-texts and related traditions" could be transmitted across this gap of time, citing the Second Merseburg Charm as an example.

== Editions ==
- Foys, Martin et al. Old English Poetry in Facsimile Project (Center for the History of Print and Digital Culture, University of Wisconsin-Madison, 2019-); digital facsimile edition and Modern English translation
