= For Delayed Birth =

Old English poetic medical text

The so-called "For Delayed Birth" is an Old English poetic medical text found in the manuscript London, British Library, Harley 585, ff. 185r-v, in a collection of medical texts known since the nineteenth century as Lacnunga (‘remedies’). The manuscript was probably copied in the early eleventh century, though its sources may have been older.

The text is in fact a set of prose instructions which include a series of short poems which should be recited as part of one or more rituals. The text is an important witness to non-orthodox Anglo-Saxon Christian religious practice and to women's history: it is unique among Anglo-Saxon medical texts for being explicitly for use and recitation by a woman. However, 'this charm is perhaps misnamed, because it deals, not with delayed birth as such, but with the inability of the wifman [woman] for whom it is written to conceive at all, or to bring a child to term without miscarriage.'

== Text ==
As edited by Elliott Van Kirk Dobbie but with long vowels marked with acute accents, the text runs:

Se wífman, se hire cild áfédan ne mæg, gange tó gewitenes mannes birgenne and stæppe þonne þríwa ofer þá byrgenne and cweþe þonne þríwa þás word:
þis mé tó bóte þǽre láþan lætbyrde,
þis mé tó bóte þǽre swǽran swǽrbyrde,
þis mé tó bóte þǽre láðan lambyrde.

Translation:

Let that woman who cannot nourish her child walk to the grave of a departed person and then step three times over the burial, and then say these words three times:
this as my remedy for the hateful late birth,
this as my remedy for the oppressive heavy birth,
this as my remedy for the hateful lame birth.

And þonne þæt wíf séo mid bearne and héo tó hyre hláforde on reste gá, þonne cweþe héo:
Up ic gonge, ofer þé stæppe
mid cwican cilde, nalæs mid cwellendum,
mid fulborenum, nalæs mid fǽgan.

Translation:

And when that woman is with child and she goes to bed beside her husband, then she should say:
I walk up, step over you
with a living child, in no way with a killing one,
with a fully born one, in no way with a doomed one.

And þonne séo módor geféle þæt þæt bearn sí cwic, gá þonne tó cyrican, and þonne héo tóforan þán wéofode cume, cweþe þonne:
Críste, ic sǽde, þis gecýþed!

Translation:

And when that mother perceives that the child is alive, she must then walk to church and when she comes before the altar, she should then say:
To Christ, I said, has this been made known!

Se wífmon, se hyre bearn áfédan ne mæge, genime héo sylf hyre ágenes cildes gebyrgenne dǽl, wrý æfter þonne on blace wulle and bebicge tó cépemannum and cweþe þonne:
Ic hit bebicge, gé hit bebicgan,
þás sweartan wulle and þysse sorge corn.

Translation:

Let that woman who cannot nourish her child take in person part of her own child's grave, then wrap it in black wool, and sell it to merchants, and then say:
May I trade it, may you trade it,
this black wool and this seed of grief.

Se wífman, se ne mæge bearn áfédan, nime þonne ánes bléos cú meoluc on hyre handæ and gesúpe þonne mid hyre múþe and gange þonne tó yrnendum wætere and spíwe þǽr in þá meolc and hlade þonne mid þǽre ylcan hand þæs wæteres múð fulne and forswelge. Cweþe þonne þás word:
Gehwér férde ic mé þone mǽran magaþihtan,
mid þysse mǽran meteþihtan;
þonne ic mé wille habban and hám gán.
Þonne héo tó þán bróce gá, þonne ne beséo héo, nó ne eft þonne héo þanan gá, and þonne gá héo in óþer hús óþer héo út oféode and þǽr gebyrge métes.

Translation:

Let that woman who cannot nourish her child then take the milk of a cow of one colour in her hands and then drink it with her mouth, and then walk to running water, and spit the milk into it, and then ladle a mouthful of that water with that same hand, and swallow it all. She should then say these words:
Wherever I transported the noble powerful-bellied stomach
with this noble powerful-bellied food;
then I wish to have myself and to go home.
Then she must walk to that brook when no-one can see her, nor [see her] when she returns from there, and then she must go into another house than the one she departed from and bury the food there.

== Editions ==
- Foys, Martin et al. Old English Poetry in Facsimile Project (Center for the History of Print and Digital Culture, University of Wisconsin-Madison, 2019-); digital facsimile edition and Modern English translation
