= Dark Riders (Fifth Cycle) =

Dark Riders is a 1991 role-playing supplement for Fifth Cycle published by Shield Games.

== Contents ==
Dark Riders is a supplement in which the County of Markstrand is detailed, and includes an adventure scenario.

== Reception ==
Christopher Earley reviewed Dark Riders in White Wolf #30 (Feb., 1992), rating it a 2 out of 5 and stated that "As a generic fantasy supplement, there should be no logistical problems with integrating this material into other FRPGs, but to be honest, there is nothing here that warrants special attention by gamers who are happy with their own system's products, or who enjoy developing their own material."

== Reviews ==
- Dragon #179
