= Stephen Pollington =

English author

Stephen Pollington is an English author and teacher who specialises in Anglo-Saxon England and the Old English language. He has written a number of books on the subject, most of which have been published by the company Anglo-Saxon Books.

In 2010, Pollington co-authored Wayland's Work: Anglo-Saxon Art, Myth and Material Culture 4th-7th Century with Lindsay Kerr and Brett Hammond. When reviewed in Antiquaries Journal, the monograph was noted for its "synthesis of current knowledge." The Council for British Archaeology's magazine British Archaeology, however, was largely critical of the use of "original research and non specialist summary." A paper based on his keynote speech at the Cambridge conference ‘Medieval Feasting, Hospitality and Gift-Exchange’ (August 2009) was published as ‘The Mead-Hall Community’ in Journal of Medieval History Volume 37, Issue 1, March 2011.

He provided the voice of the Anglo-Saxon Chronicle for the Mayavision - BBC television series King Alfred and the Anglo Saxons in which the Chronicle entries were read in Old English.

Pollington co-authored a report on the making of a replica of the Sutton Hoo stone with Paul Mortimer and its wider implications, from which he was invited to present a paper at the Wystawa podczas konferencji archeologicznej w Bytowie in September 2014 (proceedings forthcoming).

== Publications ==
- Pollington, Stephen (1989). The Warrior's Way: England in the Viking Age. Blandford. ISBN 978-0-7137-2120-1.
- Pollington, Stephen (2009). Wordcraft: New English to Old English Dictionary and Thesaurus (4 ed.). Anglo-Saxon Books. ISBN 978-1-898281-53-5.
- Pollington, Stephen (1996). An Introduction to the Old English Language and its Literature (revised ed.). Anglo-Saxon Books. ISBN 978-1-898281-06-1.
- Pollington, Stephen (2004). First Steps in Old English (3 ed.). Anglo-Saxon Books. ISBN 978-1-898281-19-1.
- Pollington, Stephen (2008). Rudiments of Runelore (3 ed.). Anglo-Saxon Books. ISBN 978-1-898281-16-0.
- Pollington, Stephen (2001). The English Warrior from Earliest Times till 1066 (revised ed.). Anglo-Saxon Books. ISBN 978-1-898281-27-6.
- Pollington, Stephen (2000). Leechcraft: Early English Charms, Plantlore and Healing. Anglo-Saxon Books. ISBN 978-1-898281-47-4.
- Pollington, Stephen (2009). Mead Hall: The Feasting Tradition in Anglo-Saxon England (2 ed.). Anglo-Saxon Books. ISBN 978-1-898281-54-2.
- Pollington, Stephen (2008). Anglo-Saxon Burial Mounds: princely burial in the 6th & 7th centuries. Anglo-Saxon Books. ISBN 978-1-898281-51-1.
- Pollington, Stephen (2008). Anglo-Saxon FAQs. Anglo-Saxon Books. ISBN 978-1-898281-50-4.
- Pollington, Stephen; Kerr, Lindsay; Hammond, Brett (2010). Wayland's Work: Anglo-Saxon Art, Myth and Material Culture 4th-7th Century. Anglo-Saxon Books. ISBN 978-1-898281-56-6.
- Pollington, Stephen (2011). The Elder Gods: The Otherworld of Early England. Anglo-Saxon Books (Little Downham, Cambs.). ISBN 978-1-898281-64-1.
- Pollington, Stephen; Mortimer, Paul (2013). Remaking the Sutton Hoo Stone: The Ansell-Roper Replica and Its Context. Anglo-Saxon Books (Little Downham, Cambs.). ISBN 978-1-898281-69-6.
- Pollington, Stephen (2016). Runes: Literacy in the Germanic Iron Age. Anglo-Saxon Books (Little Downham, Cambs.). ISBN 9781898281757.
- Pollington, Stephen (2019). Runes: L'Alphabétisation Durant l'Âge Du Fer Germanique. Editions Heimdall (Bayeux). ISBN 978-2840484929.
- Pollington, Stephen; D'Amato, Raffaele (2023). Anglo-Saxon Kings and Warlords AD 400–1070. Osprey Publishing. ISBN 9781472855343.
- Pollington, Stephen (2024). Woden: A Historical Companion. London: Uppsala Books. ISBN 978-1-961361-06-5.
