= Nine Herbs Charm =

Old English charm

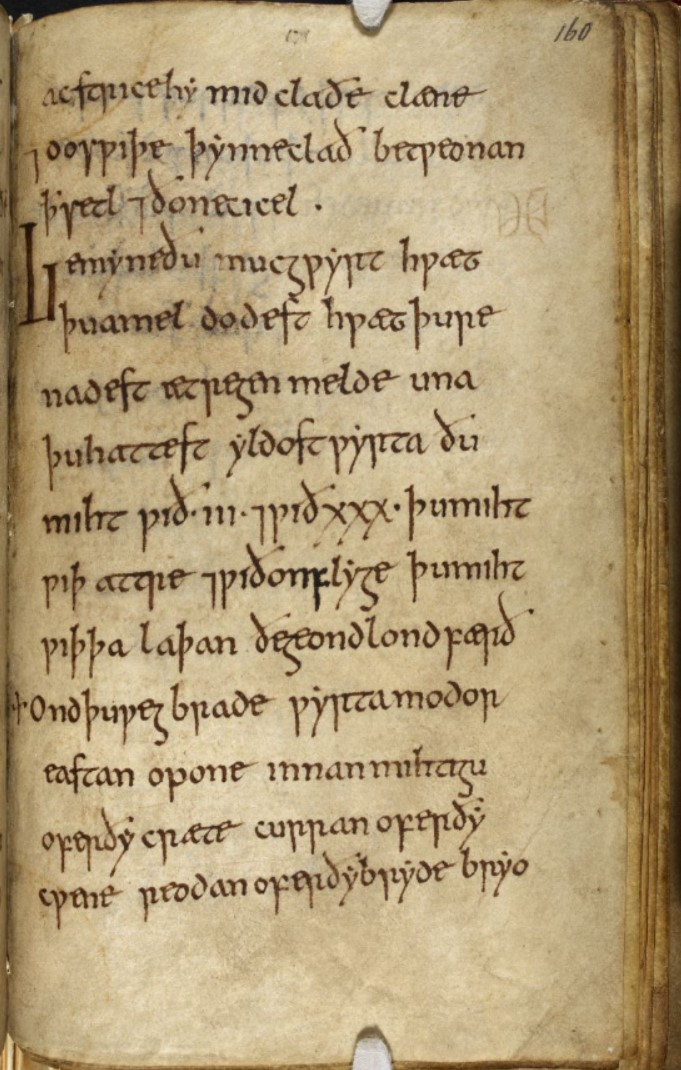
The Charm in Harley Manuscript 585 (folio 160)

The Nine Herbs Charm, Nigon Wyrta Galdor, Nine Plants Spell, Lay of the Nine Healing Herbs, or Nine Wort Spell (among other names) is an Old English charm recorded in the tenth century AD. It is part of the Anglo-Saxon medical compilation known as Lacnunga, which survives in the manuscript Harley MS 585 in the British Library. The charm involves the preparation of nine plants, sometimes listed as mugwort, plantain, lamb's cress, betony, chamomile, nettle, crab-apple, chervil and fennel.

The poem contains one of two clear mentions of the god Woden in Old English poetry; the other is Maxims I of the Exeter Book. Robert K. Gordon's translation of the section reads as follows:

A snake came crawling, it bit a man.
Then Woden took nine glory-twigs,
Smote the serpent so that it flew into nine parts.
There apple brought this pass against poison,
That she nevermore would enter her house.

Nine and three, numbers significant in Germanic paganism and later Germanic folklore, are mentioned frequently throughout the charm.

Some scholars have proposed that this passage describes Woden coming to the assistance of the herbs through his use of nine twigs, each twig inscribed with the runic first-letter initial of a plant.

According to Gordon, the spell is "clearly an old heathen thing which has been subjected to Christian censorship." Malcolm Laurence Cameron states that chanting the poem aloud results in a "marvellously incantatory effect".

== Mugwort and Swedish folklore ==
The spell contains a variety of hapax legomena, words only found in it. One of those words is una, a name by which the plant mugwort is referred to. In 2025, Swedish folklorist Sara Bonadea George identifies a parallel to the section of the spell on mugwort in much later Swedish folklore. In an obscure item from Gotland found in the Uppsala landmålsarkiv and dated to 1875, mugwort requests to be called Luna before it will provide healing powers:

Swedish

Kallar du mig Gråbo,
Botar jag hvarken kuna eller ko;
Men kallar du mig Luna,
botar jag både din ko och din kona."

English

If you call me Mugwort,
I will cure neither wife nor cow;
But if you call me Luna,
I will cure both your cow and your wife."

The bottom of the entry card makes references to noa-names but contains no further information, implying that the word Luna was understood at least by the folklorist as a form of taboo avoidance. Bonadea George says "the definitive answer on why mugwort should be called Luna to become healing herb is hidden in an obscure past that we can no longer access."

== Contemporary arts ==
Stephen Pollington's and Joseph S. Hopkins's translations of the spell are adapted and prominently featured in the 2025 film Hamnet directed by Chloé Zhao.

== See also ==
- Galdr
- Hávamál
- Mímir
- Merseburg Incantations
