= Lacnunga =

Anglo-Saxon literary work

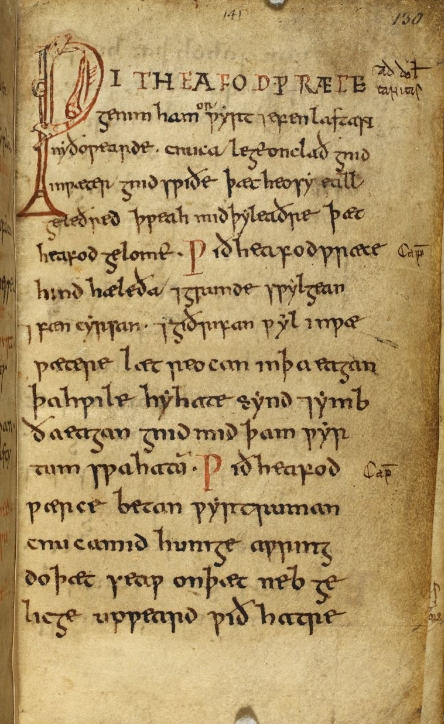
First page of Lacnunga, beginning Ƿit heafodwræce ("against headache")

Lacnunga is a collection of miscellaneous Anglo-Saxon medical texts and prayers, written mainly in Old English and Latin. The title Lacnunga, an Old English word meaning "remedies", is not in the manuscript: it was given to the collection by its first editor, Oswald Cockayne, in the nineteenth century. It is found, following other medical texts, in the British Library's Harley MS 585, a codex probably compiled in England in the late tenth or early eleventh century. Many of its herbal remedies are also found, in variant form, in Bald's Leechbook, another Anglo-Saxon medical compendium.

== Contents ==
Lacnunga contains many unique texts, including numerous charms, some of which provide rare glimpses into Anglo-Saxon popular religion and healing practices. Among the charms are several incantations in Old English alliterative verse, the most famous being those known as For Delayed Birth, the Nine Herbs Charm and Wið færstice ("Against a sudden, stabbing pain"). There are also several charms in corrupt Old Irish.

Among the Latin prayers, the longest is a redaction of the Lorica of Laidcenn (formerly often known as the Lorica of Gildas). This seventh-century Irish poem, also preserved in other manuscripts, is a member of the lorica genre of protective prayers. This instance takes the form of an extended litany of body parts for which the speaker seeks the protection of Christ and a multitude of angels from the assaults of demons. It is accompanied in this manuscript by an interlinear gloss in Old English, which probably derives from an exemplar in the Mercian dialect.

Other texts include:

- Against a dwarf

== Editions, translations and facsimiles ==
- Cockayne, O. (ed.). 1864–66. Leechdoms, Wortcunning, and Starcraft of Early England, The Rolls Series, 35, 3 vols (London: Longman and others). First edition and translation of the text, but incomplete.
- Doane, A. N. 1994. Anglo-Saxon Manuscripts in Microfiche Facsimile: Volume 1, Medieval and Renaissance Texts and Studies, 136 (Binghamton, N.Y.: Medieval & Renaissance Texts and Studies). No. 265 is a facsimile of Harley 585.
- Grattan, J. H. C. and C. Singer. 1952. Anglo-Saxon Magic and Medicine Illustrated Specially from the Semi-Pagan Text 'Lacnunga', Publications of the Wellcome Historical Medical Museum, new series 3 (London: Oxford University Press). Edition and translation.
- Herren, M. W. 1987. The Hisperica Famina: II. Related Poems: A Critical Edition with English Translation and Philological Commentary (Toronto: Pontifical Institute of Mediaeval Studies). Includes an edition of the Lorica of Laidcenn from all manuscripts.
- Niles, John D. and Maria A. D'Aronco. 2023. Medical Writings from Early Medieval England, Volume I: The Old English Herbal, Lacnunga, and Other Texts, Dumbarton Oaks Medieval Library 81 (Cambridge, MA: Harvard University Press, 2023). Edition and translation, along with other medical texts.
- Pettit, Edward. 2001. Anglo-Saxon Remedies, Charms, and Prayers from British Library MS Harley 585: The ‘Lacnunga’, 2 vols. (Lewiston and Lampeter: Edwin Mellen Press). Latest edition, with translation, detailed introduction, commentary and appendices, and full bibliography (supplemented by the editor's website: ). [link broken]
- Pollington, S. 2000. "Leechcraft: Early English Charms, Plantlore, and Healing" (Hockwold-cum-Wilton, Norfolk: Anglo-Saxon Books). Edition and translation, along with other Old English medical texts.
- Catalogue record on the British Library website
