= Aspects of Anglo-Saxon Magic =

1996 book by Bill Griffiths

- The paperback cover of the revised edition
- Author: Bill Griffiths
- Language: English
- Subject: Anglo-Saxon history Religious studies Pagan studies
- Publisher: Anglo-Saxon Books
- Publication date: 1996, 2003 (revised edition)
- Publication place: United Kingdom
- Media type: Print (Hardback and paperback)
- Pages: 257
- ISBN: 978-1-898281-33-7

Aspects of Anglo-Saxon Magic is a study of Anglo-Saxon paganism and the role of magic in Anglo-Saxon England that was written by the English poet and independent scholar Bill Griffiths. It was first published in 1996 by Anglo-Saxon Books, and later republished in a revised edition in 2003.

Divided into two parts, the first section of the book is devoted to a discussion of Anglo-Saxon paganism and magical beliefs, in doing so drawing evidence from Anglo-Saxon, Norse and Classical sources. It looks at a wide range of different areas, including the Anglo-Saxons conception of gods, the beliefs regarding death and the ancestors, and the ideas about elves and dwarves.

== Background ==
The use of historical written sources to learn more about the pre-Christian religion of the Anglo-Saxons was something that had been going on for many decades prior to the publication of Aspects of Anglo-Saxon Magic. In 1948, Godfrid Storms published Anglo-Saxon Magic, a study of the subject which also contained a complete collection of Anglo-Saxon charms.

== Synopsis ==
=== Part One ===
In the first chapter, entitled "The Up World", Griffiths discusses the Anglo-Saxons' pre-Christian beliefs about their gods, looking at the veneration of idols and the manner in which the deities were understood by the Anglo-Saxons, in doing so contrasting them with those of the Classical world. Moving on into the second chapter, "The Dead World", Griffiths deals with the role of the ancestors in Anglo-Saxon heathenism before proceeding on to discuss beliefs in an afterlife and the reasons for performing sacrifice, Chapter three, "The Around World", looks into the beliefs regarding those species who were neither god nor humans, such as the elves and dwarves, as well as the Anglo-Saxon magical beliefs regarding medicine and agriculture.

The fourth chapter, which is entitled "The Empty World", deals with those Anglo-Saxon texts which portray the supernatural world as "a bleak reality"”, looking at conceptions of predestination and fate, whilst the fifth, entitled "The Rational World", dealt with the role of Anglo-Saxon Christianity and the wider effect that this had on English society, in particular discussing the significance of Bede,

=== Part Two ===
The second part of the book contains a series of Anglo-Saxon texts pertaining to Anglo-Saxon magical practices.

== Reception and review ==
Aspects of Anglo-Saxon Magic has not been the subject of any scholarly book reviews.

The academic archaeologist Neil Price made reference to Aspects of Anglo-Saxon Magic in his study of Norse magical beliefs, The Viking Way: Religion and War in Late Iron Age Scandinavia (2002). Praising Griffiths' approach in describing the "fluid ambiguities" of Anglo-Saxon cosmological beliefs, he considered such an approach to be an improvement on British archaeologist David M. Wilson's book Anglo-Saxon Paganism (1992), which he believed had failed to even discuss Anglo-Saxon conceptions of cosmology. Price thought that it was pertinent to "bear [Griffiths'] flexible view of the cosmos in mind" when studying Norse cosmological beliefs.

Apart from these mentions in Neil Price's out-of-print PhD thesis, Griffith's book has not made any impact within scholarship in the fields of northern paganism or Anglo-Saxon studies.

Writing on the Twisted Tree Bookshelf website, Contemporary Pagan D. James reviewed the book, praising it as a "comprehensive" study of the subject of Anglo-Saxon paganism and magic. Opining that it was a "ground breaking" study, James compared it to Brian Bates' The Way of Wyrd and recommended it to all practicing Pagans.
