= Anglo-Saxon Amulets and Curing Stones =

1981 work by Audrey Meaney

- Author: Audrey Meaney
- Language: English
- Subject: Anglo-Saxon archaeology, archaeology of ritual and magic
- Publisher: British Archaeological Reports
- Publication date: 1981
- Publication place: United Kingdom
- Media type: Print (Hardback)
- Pages: 364
- ISBN: 0-86054-148-7

Anglo-Saxon Amulets and Curing Stones is an archaeological study of amulets, talismans and curing stones in the burial record of Anglo-Saxon England. Written by the Australian archaeologist Audrey Meaney, it was published by the company British Archaeological Reports as the 96th monograph in their BAR British Series. Prior to writing the work, Meaney had published several books dealing with Anglo-Saxon burials.

In the book, Meaney opines that scholars can understand more about Anglo-Saxon beliefs regarding magic by looking at the archaeological evidence for amulets and related magic items found buried in graves. Looking at the literary evidence for magical practices, she goes on to look at a wide variety of items found in Anglo-Saxon inhumation burials which might have had amuletic properties. She categorises such artefacts into a series of overarching categories, including vegetable amulets, mineral amulets, animal amulets, manufactured amulets and found amulets, to each of which she devotes a chapter. Concluding her study, Meaney argues that amulets were primarily worn by women and children in Anglo-Saxon England, and that there were certain females, whom she termed "cunning women", who worked in a specific magical capacity for their local communities.

The book received a mixed review from the academic Hilda Ellis Davidson in the Folklore journal. Meaney herself produced a rebuttal to Ellis Davidson in the following issue. Meaney's ideas regarding Anglo-Saxon cunning women would subsequently be adopted by fellow archaeologist Tania Dickinson.

== Background ==
Prior to the publication of Anglo-Saxon Amulets and Curing Stones, Meaney had written a number of studies on the archaeological burial record from Anglo-Saxon England. 1964 saw the publication of the Gazetteer of Early Anglo-Saxon Burial Sites, brought out by Allen and Unwin. In 1970, Meaney's book, Two Anglo-Saxon Cemeteries at Winnall, Winchester, Hampshire was published by the Society for Medieval Archaeology as the fourth title in their monograph series.

== Synopsis ==
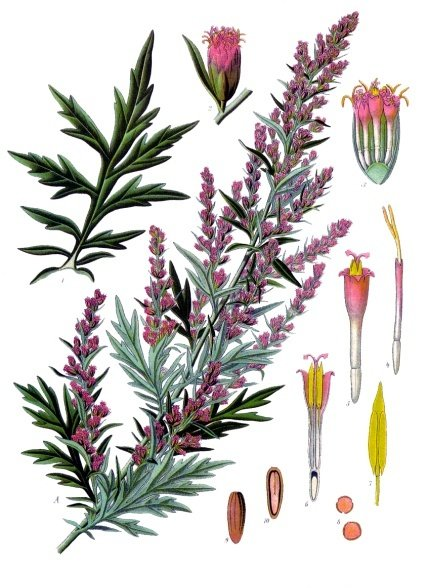
A 19th century illustration of Artemisia vulgaris, colloquially known as mugwort, a plant used for amuletic purposes in Anglo-Saxon England

Chapter one, "Introduction" opens with Meaney's discussion of how archaeology can be used to shed light on the cognitive aspects of the past. She explains how she chooses to define terms like "amulet", "talisman", "charm" and "curing stone", before making comparisons with contemporary "good luck charms" to highlight the pervasiveness of amulets in human society. Moving on, she explores the early Christian attitudes to amulets in Europe using documentary sources, before going on to look specifically at the matter in Anglo-Saxon England. Here, she examines several Early Mediaeval manuscripts, such as the Lacnunga and Bald's Leechbook, for evidence of written charms which made reference to amulets, before discussing the three known examples of Anglo-Saxon finger rings which had been engraved with a charm in runic script.

Proceeding to discuss the existence of amulets and curing stones in Anglo-Saxon burials, she notes that two conditions must apply before an artefact is labelled under one of these two categories. The first is that there should be documentary evidence that "the object was believed to have magical powers." Although recognising that the most applicable documentary evidence should come from Anglo-Saxon England, she refuses to dismiss supporting evidence from a "related or descendent culture", and cites examples as varied as the ancient Greek Natural History by Pliny the Elder to 19th-century British folk customs. Her second condition is that such artefacts should be evidently "especially valued" by those who performed the burial, being close to the body, but which were neither beautiful nor useful, implying that they must have had a different, magical purpose.

The second chapter, entitled "Vegetable Amulets", looks at the evidence for herbal amulets in the Old English medical manuscripts, noting how problematic it is to identify specific plant species from the information provided in these sources. Using information from later Middle English sources, Meaney attempts to highlight the magical uses that Anglo-Saxons had for a variety of different plants, including betony, camomile and mugwort. Following on from this, Meaney discusses the evidence of plant-based amulets from Anglo-Saxon cemeteries, noting the existence of flat wooden coils from Welbeck Hill in Lincolnshire, an oak ball from Little Wilbraham in Cambridgeshire and the vegetable fibres found at Polhill in Kent.

Chapter three, "Mineral Amulets" offers an exploration of the evidence for amulets and curing stones made out of mineral substances, such as rocks and crystals. Making use of both written sources and burial evidence from Anglo-Saxon England and neighbouring parts of Europe, Meaney focuses on the role of amber, jet, amethyst and the potential magical associations which they had in Early Medieval society. She also looks at burial evidence for the use as quartz in creating rock crystal beads and spindle whorls and also the burial of crystal balls and sieve spoons, speculating on any magical uses that such items might have had by comparing them with Medieval literary sources and later folklore. She proceeds to look into the role of quartz pebbles, holed stones, pyrites and chalk and other white substances, all of which have been found in Anglo-Saxon graves.

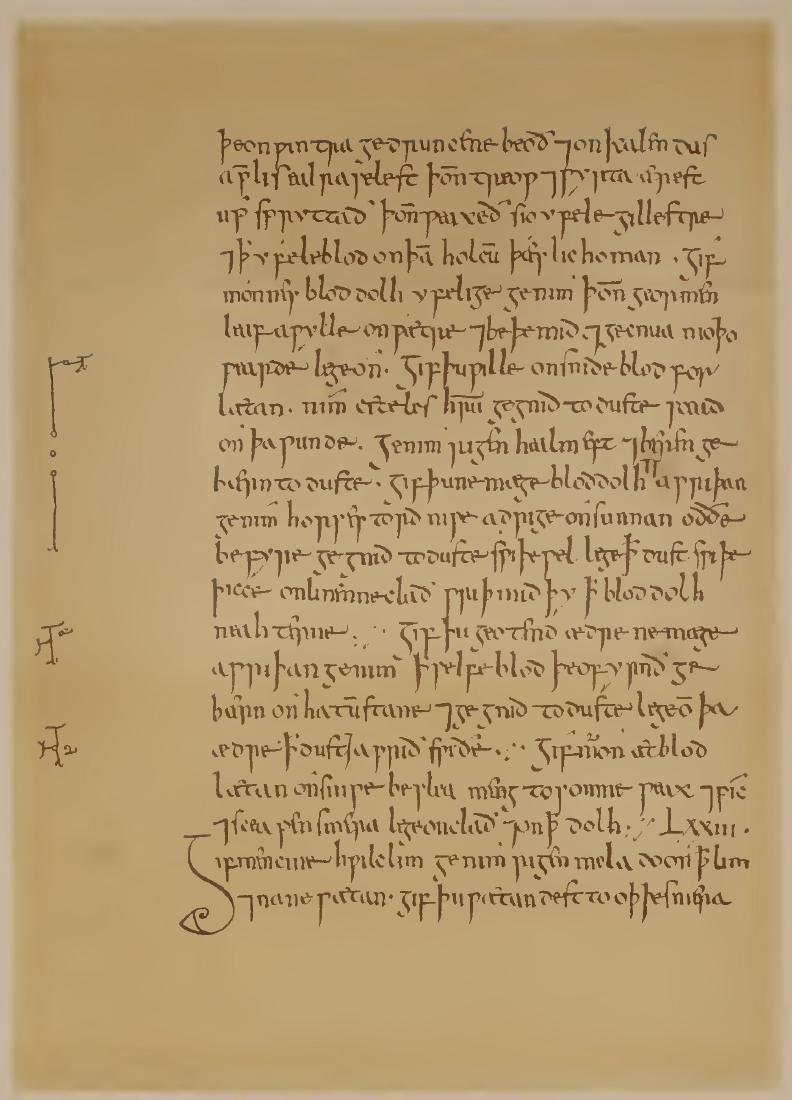
A facsimile page of Bald's Leechbook, in which several Anglo-Saxon written charms are recorded

Moving into the fourth chapter, "Animal Amulets", Meaney discusses possible amulets that were made out of animal products. After discussing Old English literary sources for magical beliefs regarding animal products, she refers to various items found within Anglo-Saxon graves which may have had amuletic properties, including fossil invertebrates like ammonites and echinoids and also shells such as cowries, which were imported to England from the shores of the Mediterranean Sea. Meaney proceeds to look into the wide variety of animal teeth found in Anglo-Saxon graves, including horse, oxen, boar and pig, dog and wolf, beaver and human, speculating as to their potential symbolism. She then rounds off the chapter with a discussion of items carved out of antler and the claws and miscellaneous bones that have sometimes been found in graves from this period.

Chapter five, "Manufactured Amulets", deals with items that were intentionally crafted by the Anglo-Saxons or neighbouring peoples, possibly with the intention of being used as amulets. Meaney opens the chapter with a look at the miniature models of weapons and tools that were often found in Anglo-Saxon graves, comparing them with toiletry items and debating their possible amuletic uses. She then looks at pendants and in particular at the Anglo-Saxon bucket pendants, making comparisons with similar items in continental Europe. Next, Meaney looks at the various metal knots, rings and keys found in Anglo-Saxon contexts, noting that the latter apparently had phallic associations. Proceeding with this analysis, she then discusses the work-boxes found in multiple female Christian graves, which contained scraps of cloth and other organic materials; Meaney looks into the possible that they are relic boxes, containing sanctified pieces of cloth. Finally, she looks at miscellaneous items such as bronze spangles and bullae found in the Anglo-Saxon context.

The sixth chapter, which is entitled "Found Amulets", looks at objects trouvés in Anglo-Saxon England, items which had probably been constructed in the preceding pre-Roman and Roman Iron Ages of English history but which had been adopted by Anglo-Saxons as trinkets and in certain cases buried with them. Meaney discusses the Anglo-Saxon use of Roman-era glass beads, either for general ornamentation or as sword beads, making use of later folklore to argue that for the Anglo-Saxons, such beads may have been viewed as amuletic. She proceeds to discuss how certain Anglo-Saxons may have made use of prehistoric worked flints for weather magic, and then their use of coinage produced by the Roman Empire, Byzantine Empire, Merovingians and Visigoths, primarily for ornamentation. Meaney looks at the Anglo-Saxon tradition of burying the deceased with "something old", such as a Roman brooch or a sherd of coloured Roman glass, suggesting that these had potential amuletic properties.

The final chapter offers a conclusion to the study, initially looking at the few amuletic items that were associated with male burials, such as magical inscriptions on armour and weaponry. She then discusses the role of amulets in infant burials before moving on to look at those included in the burials of adult women. She argues that certain female burials with particular collections of amulets represent "cunning women" who served their tribe in a magical capacity, using their abilities for both malevolent and benevolent purposes. She rounds off the book with a discussion of the changing fashions in amulets and the changing attitudes towards Anglo-Saxon amulets throughout history.

== Reception and recognition ==
=== Academic reviews ===
Anglo-Saxon Amulets and Curing Stones was reviewed in Folklore, the published journal of The Folklore Society, by the academic Hilda Ellis Davidson.

== See also ==
- The Archaeology of Ritual and Magic
- The Viking Way: Religion and War in Late Iron Age Scandinavia
- Signals of Belief in Early England: Anglo-Saxon Paganism Revisited
