= Anglo-Saxon Deviant Burial Customs =

Book by Andrew Reynolds

- The first edition cover of the book, depicting a triple Anglo-Saxon burial uncovered in the town of Staines.
- Author: Andrew Reynolds
- Language: English
- Subject: Anglo-Saxon archaeology
- Publisher: Oxford University Press
- Publication date: 2009
- Publication place: United Kingdom
- Media type: Print (Hardcover)
- Pages: 324
- ISBN: 978-0-19-954455-4

Anglo-Saxon Deviant Burial Customs is an archaeological study of atypical burial practices in Anglo-Saxon England. It was written by the English archaeologist Andrew Reynolds of the UCL Institute of Archaeology, based on the work which he had undertaken for his PhD, completed in 1998. The book was first published by Oxford University Press in 2009 as a part of their series on "Medieval History and Archaeology", edited by John Blair and Helena Hamerow.

The book has been acknowledged as providing archaeological data to back up the historical records regarding Medieval European beliefs in the undead.

== Background ==
Reynolds' investigation into Anglo-Saxon deviant burials emerged from his PhD thesis, which he undertook at the Institute of Archaeology, University College London, and completed in 1998. He decided not to publish his findings immediately afterward, because more information on this issue was coming to light as a result of further excavation. From 2002 to 2003, Reynolds undertook a year of study leave to undertake new research in this area.

== Synopsis ==
"In the pre-Christian centuries Early Anglo-Saxon communities arguably marked the burials of people considered somehow different, and perhaps dangerous to the living, in distinctive ways, and certain of these locally determined but widely understood modes of treating social 'others' can be observed to continue until the nineteenth century in England. A further argument of this book is that it is possible to observe a gradual process whereby local practices for marking out wrongdoers and others of whom their peers were wary came under increasing influence of emerging political authorities, namely kings and their councillors."

— Andrew Reynolds, 2009.

The first chapter, "Sources, approaches, and contexts", takes an interdisciplinary approach by examining the literary evidence from the Anglo-Saxon period regarding the execution and burial of those "individuals deemed social outcasts and even feared among the living for their malevolent qualities." Reynolds examines the references to punishment for deviancy within the Anglo-Saxon law codes, before looking at the evidence from charters and place-names referring to places of execution and burial sites.

Chapter two, "Burials, bodies and beheadings", focuses on the archaeological evidence for deviant burials in Anglo-Saxon England, identifying eight specific causes for such funerary deposits: victims of battles, judicial executions, massacres, murder, plague, sacrifice and suicide. For each of these, Reynolds looks at the archaeological evidence that these would each leave behind, before attempting to identify any Anglo-Saxon grave sites that fit into these categories.

In the third chapter, "Social deviants in a pagan society", Reynolds looks at the evidence for deviant burial practices from the fifth to the eighth centuries. Dismissing ideas that crouched, multiple, and shallow burials could be considered "deviant", he examines prone inhumations, decapitated and amputated bodies, and corpses with evidence of stoning, suggesting that these are best categorised as examples of deviant burial.

Chapter four, "Social Deviants in a Christian World", examines evidence from the seventh to eleventh centuries. This covers the Anglo-Saxon conversion to Christianity and Reynolds identifies that deviant burials are restricted to execution cemeteries.

Chapter five, "The Geography of Deviant Burial in Anglo‐Saxon England", combines archaeological and charter evidence to analyse the physical distribution of the evidence across the fifth to twelfth centuries. In doing so, Reynolds identifies that there was sometimes some physical separation between deviant burials and cemeteries used by communities.

The book concludes with a chapter, "Themes and Trajectories: The Wider Social Context", that summarises the key findings and notes "Perhaps the most significant observation is that execution cemeteries developed in the period of the formation and expansion of the earliest English kingdoms, and not in the shadow of the late Saxon state as is often presumed".

== Reception and reviews ==
=== Academic reviews ===
Catherine Hills of the University of Cambridge positively reviewed Reynolds' book for the journal Antiquity, announcing it to be a "significant contribution" to the study of both Anglo-Saxon England and of the archaeology of burial and justice. She noted that Reynold's ideas appeared "less novel" than they should be because he had already presented many of his conclusions in published papers and talks, and that the tome contains a number of traces betraying its origins as a doctoral dissertation. Ultimately noting that its last two chapters represent "an impressive piece of scholarship", she considers his arguments to be "persuasive and original".

Reynold's work reviewed a more critical review in The English Historical Review, authored by Tom Lambert of Sidney Sussex College, Cambridge. Lambert noted that he wished that clearer diagrams had been included in the section where Reynolds discusses family plots, and went on to criticise the book for what he argued was a circular argument, that Reynolds uses "his handlist to argue for the very criteria that were used to construct it." Lambert argued that the fifth chapter was unable to unite the separate analysis into a "coherent whole" and that, despite "some interesting ideas", Reynolds' ultimate conclusion was rushed and "inexplicably terse". Summing up his review, Lambert noted that this was an "important book" which represented a "necessary and stimulating" read, but that its flaws meant that it had to be read "very carefully".

=== Wider influence ===
Writing a review of Claude Lecouteux's book The Return of the Dead for the journal Preternature, Stephen Gordon of the University of Manchester made reference to Reynold's book, noting that he "devotes considerable attention to the relationship between the revenant narratives and unusual burial practices", in this way providing supporting evidence for many of Lecouteux's claims.

Reynolds' ideas were also positively discussed in the paper "Living On: Ancestors and the Soul", authored by Alexandra Sanmark, a Post Doctoral Research Associate at the Millennium Institute Centre for Nordic Studies and Lecturer at the University of Western Australia's Department of History. Published in the anthology Signals of Belief in Early England (2010), co-edited by Sanmark, Sarah Semple and Martin Carver, Sanmark noted that Reynold's work provided good archaeological evidence for a belief in the malevolent dead in Early Medieval England.
