= Audrey Meaney =

Archaeologist (1931–2021)

Audrey Lilian Meaney FSA FAHA (19 March 1931 – 14 February 2021) was an English archaeologist and historian specialising in the study of Anglo-Saxon England. She published several books on the subject, including Gazetteer of Early Anglo-Saxon Burial Sites (1964) and Anglo-Saxon Amulets and Curing Stones (1981).

== Biography ==
Meaney was born in England on 19 March 1931, and took a BA in English at Oxford. In 1955, she was appointed Carlisle Research Student at Girton College, Cambridge, to undertake her PhD in the Department of Anglo-Saxon, Norse and Celtic (completed in 1958), entitled A Correlation of Linguistic and Archaeological Evidence for Anglo-Saxon Heathenism. This established Meaney's interdisciplinary approach to early medieval history, which is noteworthy for its combination of archaeological and textual sources.

On finishing her PhD, Meaney moved to Australia, to the English Department at the University of New England; 'in the interests of her marriage' she moved to Sydney, taking temporary academic positions there until, in 1968, she was appointed to the recently formed Macquarie University, where she taught until her retirement in 1989, balancing the requirements of work with those of motherhood. In 1984, she became the first Macquarie academic to be elected as a Fellow to the Australian Academy of the Humanities. According to Di Yerbury:

Her contribution to Macquarie University extended deep into its fabric and well-being. She was very influential in the early development of the new University's teaching programs. She was active in several committees, and took on the responsibilities of Acting Head of the School of English and Linguistics. She quietly but persistently promoted the role of women and women's studies. Indeed, her interest in the role of women has been a dominant theme in her research into Anglo-Saxon culture, removing yet another layer of invisibility over women's place in history.

Meaney took a leading role in founding the Sydney Medieval and Renaissance Group and the Australian and New Zealand Association for Medieval and Renaissance Studies. On her retirement, she moved to Cambridge.

Meaney produced A Gazetteer of Early Anglo-Saxon Burial Sites, published by George Allen & Unwin in 1964. Asserting that it was "in intention exhaustive up to the end of 1960", she noted that she had not included later discoveries due to her residence in Sydney. While teaching in Australia, Meaney returned frequently to the UK to undertake excavations and 1970 saw her publication, jointly with Sonia Hawkes, of the excavation report for Two Anglo-Saxon cemeteries at Winnall, Winchester, Hampshire. The 1980s saw Meaney shifting her focus from archaeology to written texts, developing her work on amulets in an influential series of articles on Anglo-Saxon medicine which have made her one of the most important commentators on the history of early medieval Western medicine.

A detailed list of Meaney's publications up to around 1992 was provided by Sue Spinks.

Meaney was elected as a Fellow of the Society of Antiquaries of London on 1 January 1977 and to the Australian Academy of the Humanities in 1984.

== Legacy ==
Meaney's retirement from Macquarie University prompted a 1992 special issue of the journal Parergon, Essays on Early England in Honour of Audrey Meaney.

In 2010, Oxbow Books published an anthology titled Signals of Belief in Early England: Anglo-Saxon Paganism Revisited, edited by the archaeologists Martin Carver, Alex Sanmark and Sarah Semple. The book was published in honour of Meaney, "in appreciation of her studies of Anglo-Saxon paganism." In the foreword, the archaeologist Neil Price commented on Meaney and her influential work, noting that most of the published studies that had previously delved into the world of Anglo-Saxon paganism came from her "monumental output", and that it was her "years spent patiently excavating Anglo-Saxon attitudes this collection honours."
