= Witchcraft in Anglo-Saxon England =

National early medieval occurrence of witchcraft

Witchcraft in Anglo-Saxon England (Old English: wiċċecræft) refers to the belief and practice of magic by the Anglo-Saxons between the 5th and 11th centuries AD in Early Mediaeval England. Surviving evidence regarding Anglo-Saxon witchcraft beliefs comes primarily from the latter part of this period, after England had been Christianised. This Christian era evidence includes penitentials, pastoral letters, homilies and hagiographies, in all of which Christian preachers denounce the practice of witchcraft as un-Christian, as well as both secular and ecclesiastical law codes, which mark it out as a criminal offence.

From surviving historical and archaeological evidence from the period, contemporary scholars believe that beliefs regarding magic in Anglo-Saxon England revolved largely around magico-medicinal healing, the use of various charms, amulets and herbal preparations to cure the sick. Literary accounts of many of these medicinal charms still survive. Archaeologists have also argued that certain burials, both in the pagan and Christian periods, represented female magical practitioners, of "cunning women", who may have practised witchcraft alongside benevolent magic.

== Background ==
The period of Anglo-Saxon England lasted from circa 410 through to 1066 AD, during which individuals considered to be "Anglo-Saxon" in culture and language dominated the country's demographics and politics.

The early Anglo-Saxons had been adherents of religious beliefs now collectively known as Anglo-Saxon paganism. This was a polytheistic faith, accepting the existence of a variety of different deities, including Woden, Thunor, Tiw and Frige. Worship revolved largely around sacrificial veneration of such deities, propitiating them with votive offerings and animal sacrifice. From the 7th century, Christian missionaries from both Ireland to the west and continental Europe to the east entered Anglo-Saxon England in an attempt to convert the populace to Christianity, a monotheistic faith that accepted the existence of only one God. Initially gaining acceptance from several kings, it led to the creation of syncretic religion that blended pagan elements with Christianity.

== Literary accounts of Anglo-Saxon witches ==
In an academic paper published in 1989, Anthony Davies of the University of Groningen noted that in the surviving literature, there were five separate accounts of Anglo-Saxon witches recorded in Anglo-Saxon or Norman England. Four of these, he argued, represented witches who were “little more than literary constructs”, owing more to the folk tales of the time than to any actual magical practitioners. The fifth, he argued, represented a genuine magical practitioner accused of a malevolent act.

=== The Witch of Ailsworth ===
The Witch of Ailsworth appears in a charter discussing an Anglo-Saxon land transaction which took place in 948.

=== Gesta Regum and the Witch of Berkeley ===
In the Gesta Regum, an account written by William of Malmsbury, a reference was made to a witch living in Berkeley. Discussing the death of Pope Gregory VI, which occurred in 1046, he digressed to discuss the death of a witch that occurred at about the same time. According to William's account, she was "well-versed in witchcraft, who was not ignorant of ancient auguries, a patroness of gluttony and an arbiter of lasciviousness who set no limit to her debauches." She owned a pet jackdaw that one day made more noise than usual, something she interpreted as a sign of bad news. A messenger soon arrived, telling her that her entire family had just been killed in an (unspecified) disaster. Overcome by this bad news, she took to her bed, realising that a fatal disease was overcoming her. She summoned her two surviving children, a monk and a nun, and gave them specific instructions for her burial.

According to this account, she stated that her corpse must be sewn up in the skin of a stag, lain on her back in a stone coffin, with the lid fastened down with lead and iron. Then, a heavy stone bound with three iron chains must be attached to the top. Furthermore, the witch stated that for fifty days, masses must be held for her, with psalms sung for fifty nights. She told her children that "If I lie secure for three nights, on the fourth day bury your mother in the ground, although I fear that the earth, which has so often been burdened by my wicked acts, will be loathe to accept me and caress me to its bosom." Following her death, they duly did so, but on the first two nights, as priests were chanting psalms around the body, devils broke into the church and snapped two of the chains on the coffin lid. On the third night, another devil, more powerful and terrifying that the others, burst into the church and snapped the chain, dragging the witch from her tomb. He placed her on a waiting black horse with hooks protruding from its back, and they all then vanished, with her cries being heard as far as four miles away.

=== Gesta Herewardi and the Witch of Ely ===
In the Gesta Herewardi, a work written down by a monk of Ely before 1131, there is a description of a practising witch. According to this account, in the spring of 1070, King William I and his Norman government faced an uprising against their rule in East Anglia where native Anglo-Saxons had allied themselves with Sweyn of Denmark. Unable to quash the rebellion with military force as it entrenched itself on the Isle of Ely, King William considered making a deal with the rebels, but was dissuaded by one of his advisers, Ivo de Taillebois. Taillebois claimed that he knew an old woman "who by her art alone could crush all the courage and the defence [of the rebels] and drive them in terror from the island." William agreed to see her, and so she was brought secretly to the Norman camp at Brandon. After eight days, the Normans decided to attack the island, and the old witch was positioned at a high point among the attackers so that she could perform her magic. Denouncing the rebels and casting spells against them, she ended her rite by exposing her bare buttocks to them three times. According to this account, her magic proved ineffective, and the Normans were forced to make a hasty retreat, during which the witch fell off of her perch and broke her neck.

The author of the Gesta Herewardi claimed to have recounted this story from discussions with survivors of the guerrilla army as well as contemporary monks. However, Anthony Davies argued that the story was unlikely to be factually accurate, containing a number of problems. For instance, he believed it unlikely that King William, who by most accounts was a pious Christian, would have jeopardized the support that he had gained from the Christian Church by employing a witch. While accepting that a group of rebels did lead an uprising against Norman rule at Ely, Davies was of the opinion that this witch “belongs firmly to the realm of fiction.”

=== The Witch of Ramsey ===
A further account of an Anglo-Saxon witch can be found in the Chronicle of the Abbey of Ramsay, a document written in the 12th century which had been based upon what the anonymous author discovered through reading Old English wills, writs and charters as well as tales that were passed down in local tradition.

=== Liber Eliensis and Queen Aelfthryth ===
According to the Anglo-Saxon Chronicle, King Edward was murdered at Corfe Castle in 978. As the king developed into a cult figure, a body of literature grew up around his murder, at first implying and then accusing his step-mother, Queen Aelfthryth, of being responsible. The 12th century monastic chronicle the Liber Eliensis went so far as to accuse her of being a witch, claiming that she had murdered not only the king, but also Abbot Brihtnoth of Ely.
