= Magic in Anglo-Saxon England =

Magic in Anglo-Saxon England (Old English: galdorcræft, among various terms) refers to the beliefs and practices of magic by the Anglo-Saxons between the fifth and eleventh centuries AD in Early Mediaeval England that can be gleaned from the various sources available. In this period, magical practices were used for a variety of reasons, but from the available evidence it appears that they were predominantly used for healing ailments and creating amulets, although it is apparent that at times they were also used to curse. It was also used to describe the supernatural powers of various entities within the Anglo-Saxon consciousness and worldview, such as various pagan gods, angels, saints, the Devil, demons and elves.

The Anglo-Saxon period was dominated by two separate religious traditions, the polytheistic Anglo-Saxon paganism and then the monotheistic Anglo-Saxon Christianity, both of which left their influences on the magical practices of the time in a way that was not necessarily mutually exclusive or unsympathetic towards each other's separate traditions.

Much of what we know of Anglo-Saxon magic comes primarily from the surviving medical manuscripts, such as Bald's Leechbook and the Lacnunga, all of which describe "pagan" practices persisting well into the Christian era.

Written evidence shows that magical practices were performed by those involved in the medical profession. From burial evidence, various archaeologists have also argued for the existence of professional female magical practitioners that they have referred to as cunning women. Anglo-Saxons believed in witches, individuals who would perform malevolent magic to harm others.

In the late 6th century, Christian missionaries began converting Anglo-Saxon England, a process that took several centuries. From the 7th century on, Christian writers condemned the practice of malevolent magic or charms that called on pagan gods as witchcraft in their penitentials, and laws were enacted in various Christian kingdoms illegalising witchcraft.

== Background ==
A map illustrating the various tribal groups in Anglo-Saxon England circa 600 CE.

Following the withdrawal of the Roman armies and administrative government from southern Britain in the early 5th century CE, large swathes of southern and eastern England entered what is now referred to as the Anglo-Saxon period. During this, the populace appeared to adopt the language, customs and religious beliefs of the various tribes, such as the Angles, Saxons and Jutes, living in the area that covers modern Denmark and northern Germany. Many archaeologists and historians have believed that this was due to a widespread migration or invasion of such continental European tribes into Britain, although it has also been suggested that it may have been due to cultural appropriation on behalf of native Britons, who wished to imitate such tribes.

Either way, the Anglo-Saxon populace of England adopted many cultural traits that differed from those in the preceding Iron Age and Romano-British periods. They adopted Old English, a Germanic language that differed markedly from the Celtic and Latin languages previously spoken, whilst they apparently abandoned Christianity, a monotheistic religion devoted to the worship of one God, and instead began following Anglo-Saxon paganism, a polytheistic faith revolving around the veneration of several deities. Differences to people's daily material culture also became apparent, as those living in England ceased living in roundhouses and instead began constructing rectangular timber homes that were like those found in Denmark and northern Germany. Art forms also changed as jewellery began exhibiting the increasing influence of Migration Period Art from continental Europe.

=== Paganism and Christianity ===
Anglo-Saxonist scholar Bill Griffiths remarked that it was necessary to understand the development of the pantheon of Anglo-Saxon gods in order to understand "the sort of powers that may lie behind magic ritual." He argued that the Anglo-Saxon pagan religion was "a mass of unorganised popular belief" with various traditions being passed down orally.

== Terminology ==
The language of the Anglo-Saxons was Old English, a Germanic language descended from those of several tribes in continental Europe. Old English had several words that refer to "powerful women associated with divination, magical protection, healing and cursing". One of these was hægtesse or hægtis, whilst another was burgrune.

Another Old English term for magicians was dry, making them practitioners of drycræft. Etymologists have speculated that the latter word might have been an anglicised term for the Irish drai, a term referring to druids, who appeared as anti-Christian sorcerers in much Irish literature of the period. In this case, it would have been a term borrowed from the Celtic languages, which were widespread across southern Britain prior to the Anglo-Saxon migration.

== Sources ==
From the Early Mediaeval to the present day, much information about the Anglo-Saxons and their magical practices have been lost. What we do know comes from a small selection of historical and archaeological sources that have been able to survive.

=== Medical manuscripts ===
The "main sources of our knowledge of magic" in the Anglo-Saxon period are the surviving medical manuscripts from the period. The majority of these manuscripts come from the 11th century, some being written in Old English and others in Latin, and they are a mix of new compositions and copies of older works. Three main manuscripts survive, now known as Bald's Leechbook, the Lacnunga and the Old English Herbarium, as do several more minor examples.

Remarking on the magico-medical knowledge of the Anglo-Saxons, historian Stephen Pollington noted that the amount "actually recorded was probably only a fraction of the total available to the communities of old, since not everybody had the time and skill to write down what they knew; and furthermore that the few records that survive are only a small part of the corpus: in the thousand years since our surviving manuscripts were written there have been a multitude of cases of accidental or deliberate destruction."

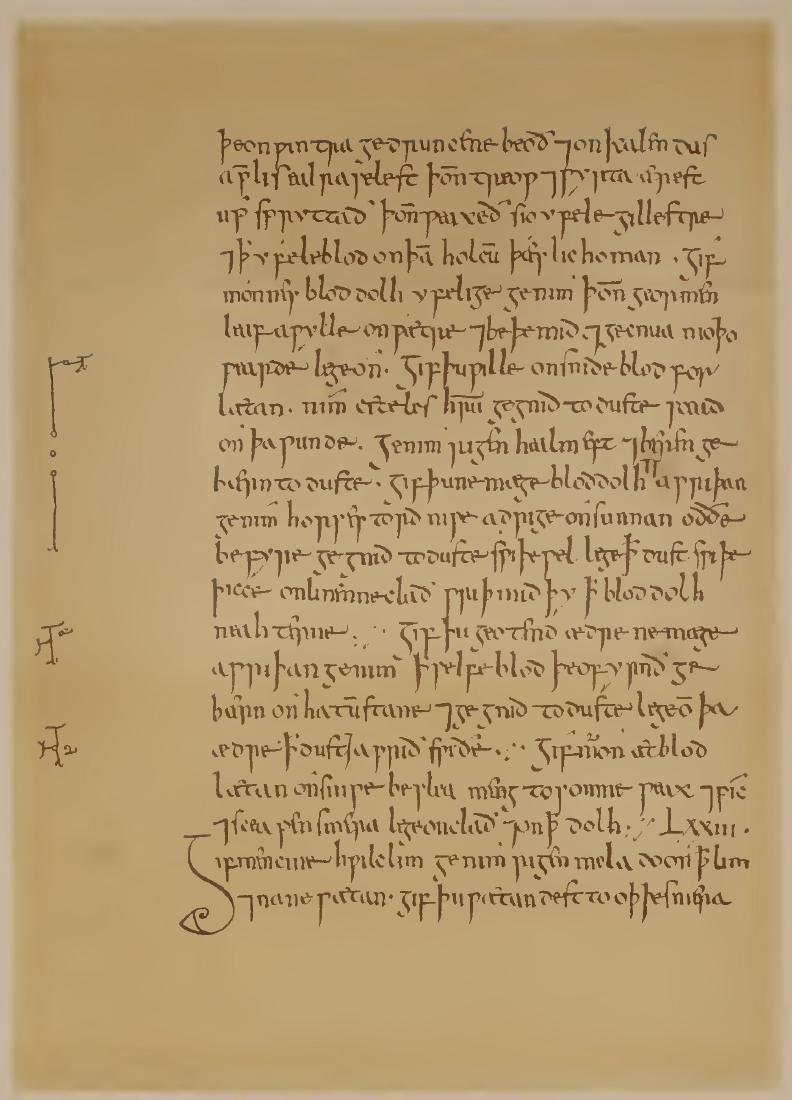
A facsimile page of Bald's Leechbook.

Bald's Leechbook was written around the middle of the 10th century, and is divided into three separate books. Written at the Winchester scriptorium that had been founded by the King of Wessex Alfred the Great (848/849–899), it is a copy of an earlier work that may have been written during Alfred's reign. The first two books in the Leechbook are a collation of Mediterranean and English medical lore, whilst the third is the only surviving example of an early English medical textbook. This third book contains remedies listed under which part of the body they are supposed to heal, with plants described under their Old English (rather than Latin) names. This implies it was written before the later Mediterranean influence that came with Christianisation. In contrast with the first two parts of the Leechbook, the third contains more magical instructions, with longer and more complicated charms and a greater folkloric component.

The second of these sources is the Lacnunga, a medical manuscript that opens with an Old English translation of the Herbarium Apulei, a description of plants and herbs found throughout classical and mediaeval Europe. The individual who had originally compiled the Lacnunga started with recipes to heal such ailments as headaches, eye pains and coughs, but whenever "he came across anything that struck his fancy for some reason or other, he immediately put it in without bothering about its form or the order of his book", leaving the work disjointed. The name "Lacnunga" does not itself appear in the manuscript, but was given to the work by the Reverend Oswald Cockayne who first edited and published it into modern English in the third volume of his Leechdoms, Wortcunning and Starcraft of Early England (1866).

Godfrid Storms compared the Leechbook and the Lacnunga, arguing that if the former had been "the handbook of the Anglo-Saxon medical man", then the latter was more like "the handbook of the Anglo-Saxon medicine-man", placing a greater emphasis on magical charms and deviating from normal medical manuscripts in style.

=== Burials ===
Archaeologists have identified evidence for magical practices in various burials from Anglo-Saxon England.

== Ritual ==
Storms noted that in Anglo-Saxon magical praxes, specific ritual procedures would have had to have been performed in the belief that doing so would enable the magical operation to work.

=== Animism ===
Godfrid Storms argued that animism played a significant role in the worldview of Anglo-Saxon magic, noting that in the recorded charms, "All sorts of phenomenon are ascribed to the visible or invisible intervention of good or evil spirits." The primary creature of the spirit world that appear in the Anglo-Saxon charms is the ælf (nominative plural ylfe, "elf"), an entity who was believed to cause sickness in humans. Another type of spirit creature, a demonic one, believed to cause physical harm in the Anglo-Saxon world was the dweorg or dƿeorg/dwerg ("dwarf"), whom Storms characterised as a "disease-spirit".

A number of charms imply the belief that malevolent "disease-spirits" were causing sickness by inhabiting a person's blood. Such charms offer remedies to remove these spirits, calling for blood to be drawn out to drive the disease-spirit out with it.

The adoption of Christianity saw some of these pre-Christian mythological creatures reinterpreted as devils, who are also referenced in the surviving charms. For instance, in the Leechbook, it states that:

Against one possessed by a devil: Put in holy water and in ale bishopwort, water-agrimony, agrimony, alexander, cockle; give him to drink.

== Charms ==
"The Anglo-Saxon charms… are of outstanding importance because they provide more than vague references of exceptional and short texts. They cannot be said to reveal everything, for there are numerous points in which they lamentably fail us, but they are numerous enough and, taken as a body, complete enough to give more than a tantalising hint of a strange world. The veil of mystification enveloping magic appears to be thin and transparent here."

— Godfrid Storms, Anglo-Saxon Magic, 1948.

Storms believed that these charm formulas were "the oldest relics of Anglo-Saxon and Germanic literature", belonging "to the oldest traditions of the Germanic and Indo-European peoples."

=== Symbolic comparisons ===
Many of the Anglo-Saxon charms use symbolic comparisons between a known, described event and the magical act being performed. In this way, the "...two things are in some way brought together, so that what happens to one of them will happen also to the other." Storms believed that in comparing the two things, the Anglo-Saxon magician hoped to actually make them similar and that their connection may have been based on a "similarity in sound, meaning, form, colour and so on." For instance, in one charm, a curse is placed upon an individual, and their punishment is compared to various other events:

May you be consumed as coal upon the hearth,
may you shrink as dung upon a wall,
and may you dry up as water in a pail.
May you become as small as a linseed grain,
and much smaller than the hipbone of an itchmite,
and may you become so small that you become nothing.

In other examples, comparisons are made between the magical operation being undertaken and Biblical events, for instance one charm states that:

Bethlehem is the name of the town where Christ was born.
It is well known throughout the world.
So may this act [a theft] become known among men.

== Magic and religion ==
In his 1948 study of the subject, entitled Anglo-Saxon Magic, Godfrid Storms noted that the surviving evidence shows "the close connection there was in Anglo-Saxon times between magic and religion." Throughout the Anglo-Saxon period, the religion of the communities living in England changed, from that of Anglo-Saxon paganism, which dominated from the fifth through to the eighth centuries, to Anglo-Saxon Christianity, which was dominant thenceforth.

=== Paganism ===
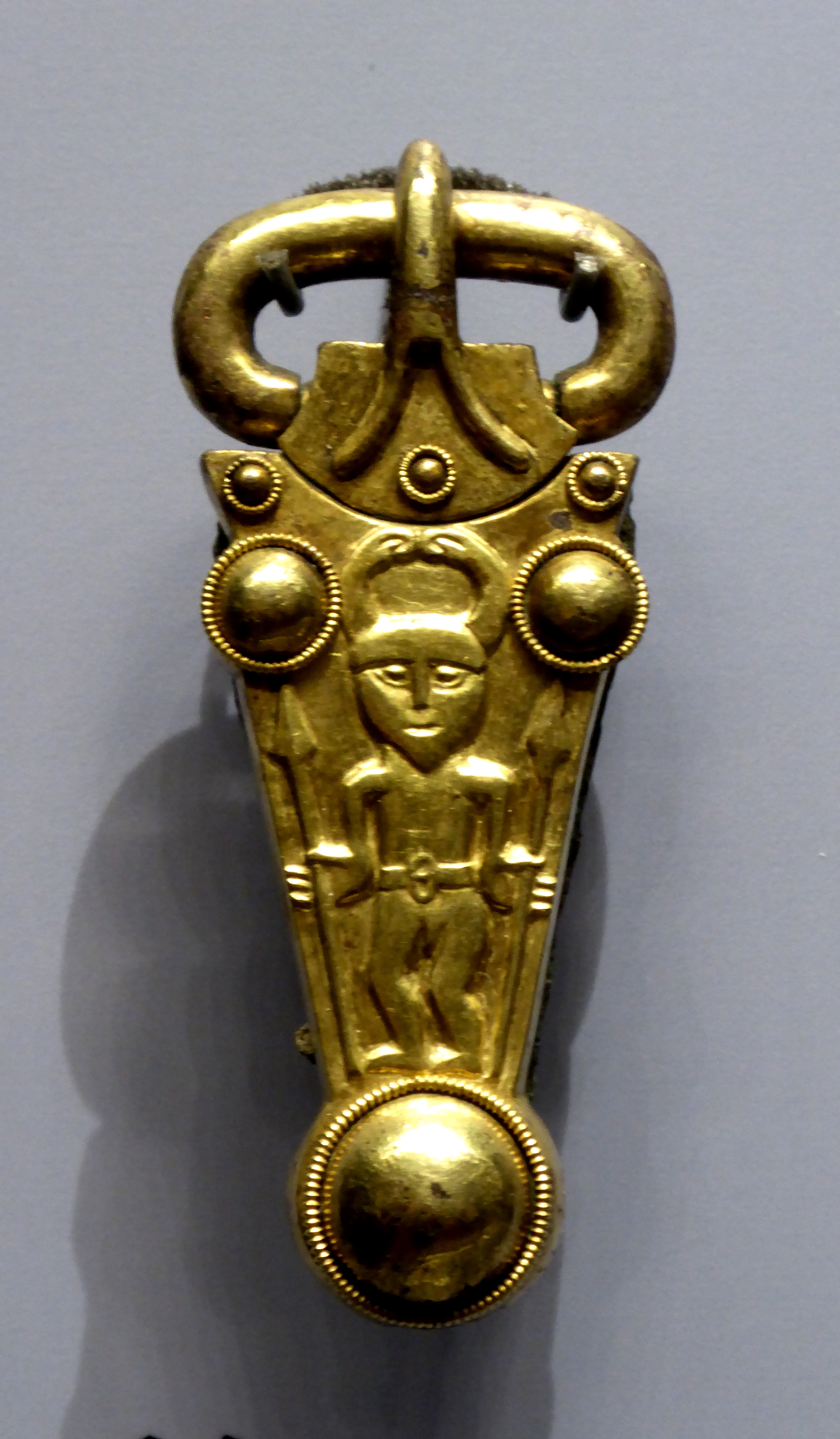
Anglo-Saxon belt buckle discovered during excavations by Sonia Chadwick Hawkes in Finglesham Anglo-Saxon cemetery, which is widely believed to depict the god Woden.

Anglo-Saxon paganism was polytheistic, believing in the existence of multiple deities. They also appeared to have revered a number of local deities and spirits in addition to holding nature and specific natural formations in high regard. lack of surviving evidence makes it unclear what Anglo-Saxon people believed the relationship between magic and the gods was like, although from examining the Norse mythological story surrounding the god Odin and his quest for knowledge, Godfrid Storms argued that across the Germanic-speaking world, there was a belief that the gods were "as much subject to magic as more earthly creatures."

The god Woden is the only pre-Christian deity to be mentioned in the surviving Anglo-Saxon charms. The charm in question is known as the Nine Herbs Charm, and involves a discussion of nine different herbs used medicinally. In the charm, it is proclaimed that:

A worm came crawling, it killed nothing.
For Woden took nine glory twigs,
he smote then the adder that it flew apart into nine parts.

Storms noted that in this charm, Woden's victory in smiting the adder is evoked to symbolise how the poison in the human body is smitten by the recitation of the charm.

Animal charms also featured prominently in Anglo-Saxon magic as wards against evil magic users. These charms contained clear zoomorphic symbolism borrowed from Pagan beliefs such as symbols of the Boar, Eagle and Wolf. Furthermore, these charms were often designed for

=== Christianity ===
Many of the beliefs in charms, the supernatural and the magical world survived Christianization and were incorporated in Popular Religion and a "Cultural Paganism" that was not always seen as being at odds with Christian beliefs. Charms were continued to be used and often contained zoomorphic symbolism such as the Wolf, Raven or Boar, obviously influenced by sacral worship of these creatures from Anglo-Saxon Paganism. These charms were often used to guard against elves and other supernatural creatures which were believed to have a malicious intent towards humans and which had access to hostile magic.

== Magical practitioners ==
There were various different kinds of magician in the Anglo-Saxon world.

=== Leeches ===
Evidence from the medical manuscripts informs us that among those who performed magic were members of the Anglo-Saxon medical profession, now known as leeches. In the context of Anglo-Saxon medics, the term "leech" was unconnected to the bloodsucking worms, instead deriving from the Old English læce, a term that in Early Mediaeval England referred to healers of any kind. Being a commonly used word in Old English, læce was the basis to several place names in England, such as Lesbury (læce-burg, or leech-fort) and Lexham (læce-ham, or leech-settlement).

The written record only ever refers to male leeches, with no mention made of any females operating in the profession. Pollington noted that this does not necessarily imply that there never were any female leeches, but could "reflect the bias of the records towards the official, fee-charging, professional physician over the local village healer or unofficial midwife."

=== Cunning folk ===
Various archaeologists, primarily Audrey Meaney and Tania Dickinson, have argued that there were cunning women, or female magical practitioners, during the Anglo-Saxon period.

== Witchcraft ==
=== Evidence from penitentials ===
Evidence for the practice of witchcraft, or malevolent magic, can be found in the written records dating from the latter centuries of Anglo-Saxon England. The earliest of these are Latin penitentials written as handbooks for Christian priests, explaining to them the type of penance required for each sin, including the sin of witchcraft. One of the earliest of these was the Paenitentiale Theodori, attributed to Theodore of Tarsus, who held the position of Archbishop of Canterbury from 667 to 690. In chapter I. XV, De Cultura Idolorum ('Concerning the worship of idols'), it states:

Theodore's original Latin: Si mulier incantationes vel divinationes diabolicas fecerit, I annum... peniteat. De hoc in canone dicitur: Qui auguria, auspicia sive somnia vel divinationes quaslibet secundum mores gentilium observant, aus in domus suas hujusmodi homines introducunt in exquirendis aliquam artem maleficiorum, penitentes isti, si de clero sunt, abiacantus; si vero seculares, quinquennio peniteant.	Modern English translation: "If a woman has performed incantations or diabolical divinations, let her do penance for one year. About which it says in the canon: Those who observe auguries or auspices or dreams or any kind of divinations according to the customs of the heathens, or introduce men of this kind into their homes in investigating a device of the magicians – if these repent, if they are of the clergy let them be cast out, but if they are truly secular people let them do penance for five years."

Commenting on this section of the Paenitentiale Theodori, the archaeologist Audrey Meaney noted that it closely resembled Isidore Mercator's Latin version of Canon 23 of the Council of Ankara. She noted however that in this penitential, the sentence for witchcraft is far lighter that than prescribed at Ankara, and it refers specifically to women as witches. This section of the Paenitentiale Theodori was quoted in the Paenitentiale Ecgberhti, which is attributed to the first Archbishop of York, Ecgbert, and also in the English Scriftboc. In the latter, it remarks that:

Original Old English: Gyf wif drycræft and galdorcræft and unlibban wyrce and swylc bega, fæste XII monað [on hlafe and on wætere].	Modern English translation: "If a woman acts with wizardry, enchantment and drugs, and succeeds, let her fast 12 months [on bread and water]."

=== Evidence from law codes ===
"[In the Anglo-Saxon witch] we have woman in her basic feminine roles as wife and lover, housekeeper and mother, and as guardian of her family’s health. In each of these aspects it is understandable that from time to time she would find inadequate the socially acceptable ways of manipulating her environment, and resort to other means, whether these were calling on the old gods whom the churchmen considered demons; using a ritual tainted by heathenism (whether pagan English, or mediterranean); or concocting a magic – and let it be admitted – probably dangerously toxic brew as an aphrodisiac or abortifacient. Only occasionally do we get a hint of a woman stepping outside her normal role, to call up the dead or foretell the future, or magically piercing a man with lumbago."

— Archaeologist Audrey Meaney on the image of the witch in Anglo-Saxon England, 1989.

In the introduction to Alfred's Laws, containing a translation of biblical judgments, it includes an alteration on the law "Do not allow sorcerers to live" from the Book of Exodus. This alteration proclaims "Do not allow the women who are accustomed to receive enchanters, magicians and witches to live." Audrey Meaney speculated that it might have been influenced by the anti-witchcraft passages in the Paenitentiale Theodori.

=== Societal role of the witch ===
In the surviving records, the Anglo-Saxon witch was usually portrayed as a young woman, who practised magic to find a lover, win the love of her husbands, give birth to a live baby or to protect her children. This is in contrast to the later English stereotype of a witch, which is that of an elderly spinster or widow. All the records of Anglo-Saxon witchcraft were produced by men, potentially explaining why it was usually women who were accused of witchcraft.
