= The Archaeology of Shamanism =

2001 book by Neil Price

- The first edition cover of the book, depicting a Mongolian shaman in a trance in 1934.
- Author: Neil Price (editor)
- Language: English
- Subject: Archaeology; Religious studies Shamanism
- Publisher: Routledge
- Publication date: 2001
- Publication place: United Kingdom
- Media type: Print (Hardcover and paperback)
- Pages: 239
- ISBN: 0-415-25255-5

The Archaeology of Shamanism is an academic anthology edited by the English archaeologist Neil Price which was first published by Routledge in 2001. Containing fourteen separate papers produced by various scholars working in the disciplines of archaeology and anthropology, it looks at the manner in which archaeologists can interpret shamanism in the archaeological record.

== Background ==
The origins of The Archaeology of Shamanism came from Price's doctoral research, which he undertook at the University of York's Department of Archaeology from October 1988 through to May 1992. Under the supervision of the archaeologists Steve Roskams and Richard Hall, Price had initially focused his research on the Anglo-Scandinavian tenements at 16–22 Coppergate in York, although eventually moved away from this to focus on archaeology within Scandinavia itself. Personal circumstances meant that Price was unable to finish his doctoral thesis at York, and in 1992 he emigrated to Sweden, where he spent the following five years working as a field archaeologist. Despite his full-time employment, he continued to be engaged in archaeological research in a private capacity, publishing a series of academic papers and presenting others at conferences. In 1996 joined the Department of Archaeology at the University of Uppsala as a research scholar, beginning full-time work there the following year. At Uppsala, he went on to complete his doctoral thesis and gain his PhD under the supervision of Anne-Sofie Gräslund, which would later be published under the title of The Viking Way: Religion and War in Late Iron Age Scandinavia.

In undertaking research for his doctoral thesis, Price took great interest in circumpolar shamanism, attending academic conferences on this subject and reading much published material that had been produced by anthropologists. He found that much of the data which he collected in this area was ultimately of little use for his thesis, and so he included it in an edited anthology which he put together entitled The Archaeology of Shamanism (2001).

== Synopsis ==
=== Part Four: Northern Europe ===
Chapter thirteen, "An ideology of transformation: Cremation rites and animal sacrifice in early Anglo-Saxon England", is provided by Howard Williams, then a Lecturer in Archaeology at Trinity College, Carmarthen in Wales. Devoted to a discussion of burial in Early Anglo-Saxon England, it focuses on the connection between cremation rites and animal sacrifice, highlighting potentially shamanic elements of such religious practices. Following a brief overview of how earlier scholars have approached the study of Anglo-Saxon paganism, the paper then provides an overview of the archaeological crematory and sacrificial evidence from Anglo-Saxon contexts. Looking at animal designs found on some cremation urns, the paper highlights the recurring image of the horse within such contexts. Drawing from anthropological comparisons, Williams looks at shamanic cultures across Eurasia and North America which have performed animal sacrifice at funerals, before going on to look at evidence from both Scandinavian and Anglo-Saxon literary sources, from which he puts forward the possibility that there may have been a shamanic component to Anglo-Saxon pagan religion.

== Reception and recognition ==
=== Academic reviews ===
"This book provides important data for understanding shamanism and its interpretation in the archaeological record, but falls short of Price's stated purpose of providing an overview of the field. This shortcoming is not solely due to the Arctic and subArctic focus, but to the conceptual and methodological lacuna arising from the lack of an empirical, etic and cross-culturally derived model of shamanism. The failure to use models derived from cross-cultural studies leaves the various authors floundering for a model from which they can assess their materials."

— Michael Winkelman, 2002.

In his review for the Cambridge Archaeological Journal, Michael Winkelman of Arizona State University noted that while Price and the other authors "adopt an approach that shamanism can be differentiated from other forms of religious phenomena", he believed that they had failed to explain how they had adopted such an approach to the reader. He furthermore opined that the work suffers from "an inability to determine just what constitutes a shaman" and how shamanism was "distinct from other magico-religious practices." Believing that the work could have been improved by a greater examination of the neurobiology behind shamanic altered states of consciousness, he notes that this was an issue which was only dealt with by J.D. Lewis-Williams in his paper. Regarding the ethnographic chapters, he remarks that they suffer from "the problem of cross-cultural reference", failing to understand the socio-cultural evolution of magico-religious practitioners, assuming that contemporary shamans practice in the same way as their historic and prehistoric forebears. Concluding his review, Winkelman accepts the importance of the anthology in illustrating both that "there is a substantial basis for an archaeology of shamanism" and that "shamanic frameworks are essential for accurate interpretation of prehistory." Despite this, he laments that the book's lack of a well defined conceptual framework is indicative that the archaeology of shamanism is still in its "infancy".
