= Bald's eyesalve =

Medieval medicine

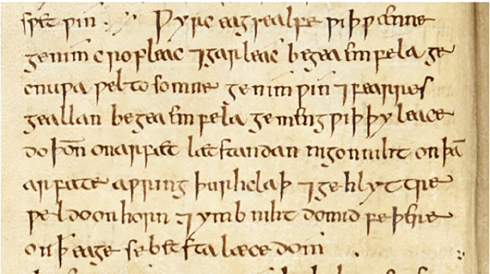
Recipe for Bald's eyesalve as written (in Old English) in Bald's Leechbook

Bald's eyesalve is an early medieval English medicine recorded in the 10th-century Anglo-Saxon Bald's Leechbook. It is described as a treatment for a "wen", a cyst or lump in the eye. The ingredients include garlic, another Allium (it is unclear which), wine and bovine bile, crushed and mixed together before being left to stand for nine days.

== Description ==
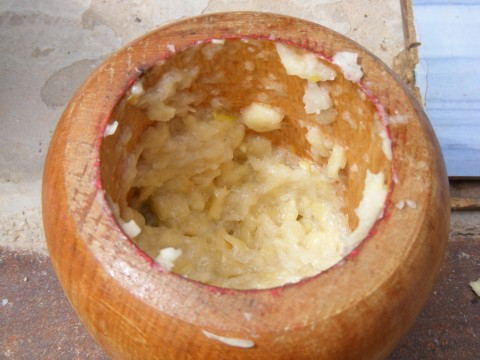
Garlic crushed with mortar and pestle

Bald's Eyesalve is a medicine described in Bald's Leechbook, a 10th-century Anglo-Saxon medical text written in Old English that survives in the collection of the British Library. The identity of Bald is not known but he is named in the work by a note that states "Bald owns this book which he ordered Cild to compile". The eyesalve is described as a treatment for a "wen" (lump) in the eye ("most likely a sty: an infection of an eyelash follicle"). Bald's Leechbook includes other treatments such as agrimony boiled in milk to combat impotency and the same substance boiled in Welsh beer to induce impotency.

The recipe for the eyesalve consists of equal parts of garlic, crushed by mortar and pestle, and cropleac (another Allium species, the translation from Old English is ambiguous; modern reproductions have used onion or leek) and equal parts (the text is ambiguous as to whether these ingredients are equal with the Allium components) of wine and oxgall (i.e. bovine bile). The mixture is left to stand in a brass or bronze container for nine days before being wrung through a cloth and clarified. The text states that the medicine should be stored in a horn and applied to the infected area with a feather at night time. The leechbook describes the mixture as se betsta læcedom (transl. the best medicine).

== Recipe translation ==
Ƿyrc eaȝsealf ƿiþ ƿænne: ȝenim cropleac ⁊ ȝarleac beȝea emfela, ȝecnuƿe ƿel tosomne, ȝenim ƿin ⁊ fearres ȝeallen beȝean emfela ȝemenȝ ƿiþ þy leaces, do þonne on arfæt læt standan niȝon niht on þæm arfæt aƿrinȝ þurh claþ ⁊ hlyttre ƿel, do on horn ⁊ ymb niht do mid feþre on eaȝe; se betsta læcedom

— Old English text in Bald's Leechbook
Translation:

Make an eyesalve against a wen: take equal amounts of cropleac and garlic, pound well together, take equal amounts of wine and oxgall, mix with the alliums, put this in a brass vessel, let [the mixture] stand for nine nights in the brass vessel, wring through a cloth and clarify well, put in a horn and at night apply to the eye with a feather; the best medicine

— Modern English translation by the British Library

== 21st-century experiments ==
A study published in 2015 explored the "ancientbiotic" potential of Bald's eyesalve. A "wen" was most likely a stye, which is caused by the Gram-positive bacterium Staphylococcus aureus, and the researchers found that the Bald remedy repeatedly killed established S. aureus biofilms in an in vitro model. The remedy also killed methicillin-resistant S. aureus (MRSA) in a mouse chronic wound model. The researchers conclude that their study indicated the importance of investigating the combined activity of ingredients in historic remedies.

A follow-up study published in 2020 found that the eyesalve had a significant anti-biofilm effect. The remedy of combined ingredients was effective at reducing biofilms of S. epidermidis and MRSA and eradicating biofilms of S. aureus Newman, A. baumannii and S. pyogenes in an established soft-tissue wound model.

In the 2020 study, researchers compared the combined remedy of Bald's eyesalve against individual active ingredients, the latter mirroring current drug development practices of isolating single active compounds from historic remedies. Whilst garlic could reduce numbers of bacteria, it had no effect upon biofilms, which is a more relevant test of clinical efficacy. Only the presence of all four ingredients resulted in an effective remedy.

The researchers also tested variants of the eyesalve made with onion and with leek, since it was unclear which might have been used in the original recipe. A preparation made with onion was found to be more effective than one made with leek.

== See also ==
- Against a Wen
