= Birmingham Archaeology =

Archaeological unit

Birmingham Archaeology (formerly Birmingham University Field Archaeology Unit (BUFAU)) was the commercial arm of the Institute of Archaeology and Antiquity at the University of Birmingham. Birmingham University Field Archaeology Unit was founded in 1976 under its founder-director Martin Carver. Birmingham Archaeology closed down in 2012.

Before its closure, Birmingham Archaeology comprised three distinct teams; Birmingham Archaeology Heritage Services, the Visual and Spatial Technology Centre (VISTA) and Birmingham Archaeo-Environmental (BAE). Each of the groups was responsible for the undertaking of commercial projects and services, the development of research projects and the delivery of postgraduate and professional training via taught Masters programmes and CPD workshops.

In 2009, Birmingham Archaeology was co-responsible for the archaeological recovery of the Staffordshire Hoard, the largest hoard of Anglo-Saxon gold ever found. In 2010 they excavated at Knowles Mill, a former corn mill in the Wyre Forest.
