= The Viking Way (book) =

2002 book by Neil Price

The Viking Way: Religion and War in Late Iron Age Scandinavia
- The first edition cover of the book, depicting a late 10th century runestone from Aarhus, Denmark, decorated with a Mammen style face-mask.
- Author: Neil Price
- Language: English
- Subject: Archaeology; Religious studies Pagan studies
- Publisher: Department of Archaeology and Ancient History, Uppsala
- Publication date: 2002
- Publication place: United Kingdom
- Media type: Print (Hardcover and paperback)
- Pages: 435
- ISBN: 91-506-1626-9

The Viking Way: Religion and War in Late Iron Age Scandinavia is an archaeological study of old Norse religion in Late Iron Age-Scandinavia. It was written by the English archaeologist Neil Price, then a professor at the University of Aberdeen, and first published by the Department of Archaeology and Ancient History at Uppsala University in 2002. A revised second edition was published in 2017 by Oxbow Books.

Price had worked on the subject of Norse paganism for his doctoral thesis, undertaken between 1988 and 2002, first at the University of York, England and then at the University of Uppsala, Sweden. Although primarily archaeological, Price took an interdisciplinary approach to the subject, drawing evidence from other disciplines such as history and anthropology.

Divided into seven chapters, Price opened the book with a discussion of his theoretical approach, before providing an overview of what is known of pre-Christian Norse religion and magic from both literary and archaeological studies. He then moved into providing a deeper study of Seiðr, or Norse magical practices, identifying shamanic elements within it.

The book was widely acclaimed by archaeologists working in European archaeology, and praised as a model for both future interdisciplinary research and for understanding past religious beliefs from an archaeological perspective.

== Background ==
The origins of The Viking Way came from Price's doctoral research, which he undertook at the University of York's Department of Archaeology from October 1988 through to May 1992. Under the supervision of the archaeologists Steve Roskams and Richard Hall, Price had initially focused his research on the Anglo-Scandinavian tenements at 16–22 Coppergate in York, although he eventually moved away from this to focus on archaeology within Scandinavia itself. Personal circumstances meant that Price was unable to finish his doctoral thesis at York, and in 1992 he emigrated to Sweden, where he spent the following five years working as a field archaeologist. Despite his full-time employment, he continued to be engaged in archaeological research in a private capacity, publishing a series of academic papers and presenting others at conferences. In 1996 joined the Department of Archaeology at the University of Uppsala as a research scholar, beginning full-time work there the following year. At Uppsala, he went on to complete his doctoral thesis and gain his PhD under the supervision of Anne-Sofie Gräslund.

In undertaking research for his doctoral thesis, Price took great interest in circumpolar shamanism, attending academic conferences on this subject and reading much published material that had been produced by anthropologists. He found that much of the data which he collected in this area was ultimately of little use for his thesis, and so he included it in an edited anthology which he put together entitled The Archaeology of Shamanism (2001).

== Synopsis ==
"Where in our synthetic models of the period do we find serious consideration of the torch-carrying man who walked backwards round a funeral pyre, completely naked and with his fingers covering his anus; the herd of six-legged reindeer depicted on a wall-covering; the armed women who worked a loom made from human body-parts; the elderly Sámi man who was buried in a Nordic woman's clothes; the men who could understand the howling of wolves; the women with raised swords who paced beneath trees of hanging bodies; the men who had sex with a slave-girl, and then strangled her, as a formal sign of respect for her dead master; the woman buried with silver toe-rings and a bag full of narcotics?"

— Neil Price, 2002.

=== Part 1: Different Vikings? Towards a cognitive archaeology of the later Iron Age ===
Price opens The Viking Way with a discussion of why he chose to write the book, noting how he wanted to understand the mindset of the Scandinavians living in the Viking Age; in his own words, the book is his attempt to "write an explicitly 'cognitive' archaeology of the Vikings". He proceeds to explain his interdisciplinary approach to the subject of Norse paganism, drawing from textual sources as well as archaeology. Noting that this is a view that has been championed by post-processualists like Ian Hodder, he proceeds to discuss the manner in which the Scandinavian Late Iron Age is simultaneously viewed as the final period of prehistory and the first of the medieval.

Price goes on to discuss the role of cognitive archaeology and its multiple problems, but nonetheless defends his position in taking a cognitive archaeological approach within his study. He then highlights the rise of Fourth World archaeology, a sub-section of world archaeology that focuses on the histories of contemporary indigenous peoples, and notes the impact which this has on his study, in particular regarding his work with the Sami people of Northern Europe. He highlights the need to recognise that modern archaeologists have many problems facing the cognitive understandings of past people like the Norse, arguing for the need to take an approach which he terms "odd archaeology", recognising the "oddness" of societies other than our own. He contrasts this "odd archaeology" with queer archaeology, which focuses on the study of deviants within any given society. He then rounds off the chapter by summarising the rest of The Viking Way's contents.

=== Part 2: Problems and paradigms in the study of Old Norse sorcery ===
After offering an overview of what is known about Norse mythology from surviving Scandinavian literary sources, Price continues to discuss the various research perspectives that have been adopted by past scholars investigating Norse paganism, including those of philologists and specialists in religious studies. Focusing on the pre-Christian religions themselves, he then discusses Iron Age Scandinavian beliefs regarding deities such as Óðinn and Þórr. Price moves on to look at the wide variety of other supernatural entities that existed within the Norse world-view: the servants of the gods (i.e. the valkyrja and Huginn and Muninn), the beings with cosmological purpose (i.e. the Nornir), the Jötnar, the supernatural beings of nature (i.e. dvergr and elves), 'spirits' and projections of the human soul. He then discusses the evidence for temples and sacred spaces in Iron Age Scandinavia, and the various priestly figures who would have carried out cultic functions.

In the second part of the chapter, Price looks more specifically at the Norse magical practices, known as Seiðr. Noting that there were specific terms applying to different forms of magical practice in the Norse context, such as Galdr and Gandr, he also highlights the fact that sorcery was intricately connected to cultic practice. He then proceeds to look at the various literary sources which refer to Seiðr, such as the Skaldic poetry, Eddic poetry, the sagas of the kings, sagas of the Icelanders, the fornaldarsǫgur, the Biskupasǫgur, law codes and also several non-Scandinavian sources. Finally, he offers an overview of earlier scholarly research into Seiðr, discussing a variety of studies published from the 19th century through to the beginning of the 21st.

=== Part 3: Seiðr ===
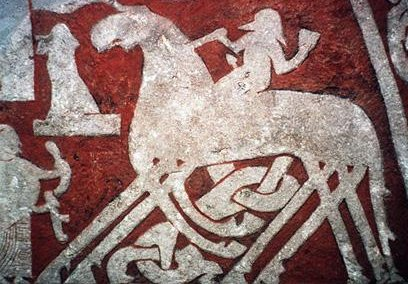
Óðinn riding on his eight-legged horse Sleipnir, depicted on the Tjängvide image stone. Price describes the god's association with sorcery and shamanism.

The third chapter is devoted to an examination of the literary and archaeological evidence for Seiðr practices in Norse society. Price starts with an examination of the god Óðinn, noting his literary associations with sorcery and shamanism, as well as identifying the shamanic and magical associations of those supernatural beings that served him, such as his horse Sleipnir and ravens Huginn and Muninn. Furthermore, he lists a total of 240 names which have been applied to Óðinn in the Norse literature, illustrating his multi-faceted role in Norse religion. Moving on to look at another deity, Freyja, Price discusses her association with magic and sorcery, before then discussing shamanistic and magical elements in pagan Norse cosmology.

Price goes on to look at the "performers" of Seiðr, the majority of whom were apparently female. He discusses various references to female magicians in Old Norse literature, and looks into the multitude of different words used for them, arguing that some of them may have referred to different categories of magician. He then proceeds to discuss male magicians, who were a minority in the surviving literature, being viewed as deviants who had committed ergi. He moves on to deal with accounts of the Seiðr-workers' assistants in the literature, before turning his attention to the burial evidence for Norse magical practitioners. Here, he notes that both inhumation and crematory burial can be interpreted as perhaps being the resting place of sorcerers if they are buried with items which likely had magical uses, such as staffs and narcotics. As evidence, Price highlights a number of Viking Age graves that have been excavated in Scandinavia and found to contain potentially magical items; this includes three inhumation burials at Birka in the town of Björkö in Uppland, and two cremation burials at Klinta in Köpings parish, Öland, all of which were in Sweden, as well as a Danish grave from the cemetery at Fyrkat in Jylland and another from the Swedish cemetery at Aska in Hagebyhöga parish, Östergötland. Looking at the Oseburg ship burial in Norway, he then looks at the burial of what appears to be an Anglo-Scandinavian individual from the Danelaw who was discovered at Peel Castle on the Isle of Man.

Price carries on by looking at the "performance" of Seiðr itself, discussing the potential use of ritual architecture and space, dealing with literary and archaeological evidence for seiðhjaller platforms, chair pendants, door frames and empty ritual space (útiseta). He follows this with a study of the clothes that magical practitioners may have worn, discussing ideas regarding masks, veils and head coverings. Debating whether they made use of drums in their performance of Seiðr, he then undertakes a study of the use of staffs and wands in Nordic magic, highlighting the existence of a number of metal and wooden staffs found in the archaeological record. Moving on, he looks at the evidence for the entheogenic use of narcotics and intoxicants such as alcohol, henbane and cannabis. He then rounds off this section of the chapter with a discussion of charms, songs and chants, as well as debating whether we can understand the role of trance and ecstasy in seiðr. Price proceeds to deal with the gender concepts surrounding seiðr, and the fact that male practitioners of sorcery were viewed as social and sexual deviants who had committed ergi. Looking at the role of Óðinn as sorcerer under the lens of queer theory, Price then discusses the evidence that Seiðr practices offered involved sexual acts such as masturbation. Moving on, he looks at the Norse concept of the soul, and the idea that seiðr practitioners could command spirits known as gandir. Finally, the chapter is brought to an end with a discussion of the domestic uses of seiðr, including divination, healing, hunting and weather magic.

=== Part 5: Circumpolar religion and the question of Old Norse shamanism ===
Proceeding to discuss evidence for shamanism in Scandinavia, Price casts a critical eye on previous scholarship that has argued for the existence of shamanistic beliefs and practices from the Paleolithic through to the Viking Age, being particularly critical of Jimmy Strassburg's work. He then looks at the arguments that have previously been put forward describing seiðr as shamanic.

== Reception and recognition ==
=== Academic reviews ===
The Viking Way was reviewed in the journal Antiquity by Matthew Townend of the University of York's Centre for Medieval Studies. Townend was of the opinion that Price's "exceptional" work represented "one of the most important contributions to Viking studies in recent years, quite possibly in recent decades", dealing as it did with the neglected area of magic in the Viking world. Praising Price's work as being "logical, persuasive and theoretically astute", he found much to commend it, opining that it had much to teach archaeologists, while at the same time being "very easy" to read, written in a prose style which was "lucid, and often stylish and witty". Furthermore, praising the use of illustrations and bibliography, he did however comment that the book would have been improved by the inclusion of an index.

Writing in Fornvännen, the archaeologist Martin Carver of the University of York praised The Viking Way as a work of "impeccable and comprehensive scholarship", but noted that a better title might have been The Viking Mind. He commended the interdisciplinary approach that Price utilized, noting that very few contemporary archaeologists had successfully taken such an approach, and expressed his opinion that Price had written a "spellbinding" work.

=== Wider academic reception ===
In his book Shamanism in Norse Myth and Magic (2009), the English scholar Clive Tolley noted that his work overlapped with Price's The Viking Way in several respects, but that Price's work focused on an archaeological rather than a literary approach to the subject. Reviewing Tolley's work in the Time and Mind journal, historian Ronald Hutton commented that Price's study had gained "much admiration" for its multidisciplinary approach. Comparing Price and Tolley's research, Hutton opined that the former played up the importance of Sami shamanic elements entering southern Scandinavia, while Tolley played it down, approaches that can be balanced with one another.

Writing in his opening paper, "Agency, Intellect and the Archaeological Agenda", published in the academic anthology Signals of Belief in Early England: Anglo-Saxon Paganism Revisited (2010), Martin Carver quoted from Price's book, before remarking that this "remarkable" work has "done much to make the study of non-Christian religion once more respectable among archaeologists."
