= Andrew Reynolds (archaeologist) =

English archaeologist

Andrew Reynolds is an English archaeologist specialising in the study of medieval Britain. He is a lecturer at the Institute of Archaeology, University College London. Reynolds worked as a field archaeologist from 1985 to 1990 before going on to gain a BA in Medieval Archaeology and a PhD from University College London.

One of his projects examined the medieval use of the Neolithic monument of Avebury in Wiltshire.

== Publications ==
=== Books ===
- Reynolds, Andrew (2002). Later Anglo-Saxon England: Life and Landscape. The History Press.
- Reynolds, Andrew (2009). Anglo-Saxon Deviant Burial Customs. Oxford and New York: Oxford University Press.

=== Edited books ===
- Griffiths, David; Reynolds, Andrew and Semple, Sarah (editors) (2003). Anglo-Saxon Studies in Archaeology and History: Boundaries in Early Medieval Britain v. 12. Oxford University School of Archaeology.
- Gilchrist, Roberta; Reynolds, Andrew, eds. (2009), Reflections: 50 Years of Medieval Archaeology, 1957–2007, London: Maney Publishing, ISBN 978-1-906540-71-5
