= Sarah Semple =

Archaeologist and university teacher

Sarah Semple FBA
- Born: July 1973 (age 53)

Academic background
- Thesis: Anglo-Saxon attitudes to the past: a landscape perspective (2002)

Academic work
- Discipline: Archaeologist
- Sub-discipline: Archaeology of the United Kingdom; Archaeology of northwest Europe; early medieval period; landscape archaeology; material culture
- Institutions: St Cross College, Oxford; University of Chester; University of Durham

Sarah Jane Semple, FBA (born July 1973) is a British archaeologist and academic, specialising in the early medieval period, landscape archaeology and material culture of northwest Europe. Having worked at St Cross College, Oxford and the University of Chester, she has taught at the University of Durham since 2006.

== Biography ==
Semple was born in July 1973. She studied medieval archaeology at the Institute of Archaeology, University College London, graduating with a Bachelor of Arts (BA) degree. She then worked in commercial archaeology, before joining The Queen's College, Oxford for postgraduate study. In 2003, she completed her Doctor of Philosophy (DPhil) degree in the University of Oxford's School of Archaeology with a doctoral thesis titled "Anglo-Saxon attitudes to the past: a landscape perspective: a study of the secondary uses and perceptions of prehistoric monuments in Anglo-Saxon society".

Having completed her DPhil, she was a post-doctoral research fellow at St Cross College, Oxford. Then, in 2004, she was appointed a lecturer at the University of Chester. In 2006, she moved to Durham University.

In January 2026, she was elected as the next president of the Society for Medieval Archaeology.

== Honours ==
In 2024, she was awarded the Landscape Archaeology Medal by the British Academy. In July 2025, she was elected Fellow of the British Academy (FBA), the United Kingdom's national academy for the humanities and the social sciences.

== Selected works ==
- Carver, Martin; Sanmark, Alex; Semple, Sarah, eds. (2010). Signals of Belief in Early England: Anglo-Saxon paganism revisited. Oxford: Oxbow Books. ISBN 978-1842173954.
- Jones, Richard; Semple, Sarah, eds. (2012). Sense of place in Anglo-Saxon England. Donington, Lincolnshire: Shaun Tyas. ISBN 978-1907730177.
- Semple, Sarah (2013). Perceptions of the prehistoric in Anglo-Saxon England: religion, ritual, and rulership in the landscape. Oxford: Oxford University Press. ISBN 978-0199683109.
- Semple, Sarah; Sanmark, Alexandra; Iversen, Frode; Mehler, Natascha (2020). Negotiating the North: meeting-places in the Middle Ages in the North Sea zone. Abingdon, Oxon; New York, NY: Routledge, Taylor and Francis Group. doi:10.4324/9781003045663. ISBN 9781003045663.
- Lund, Julie; Semple, Sarah, eds. (2021). A cultural history of objects. The Cultural Histories Series. London; New York: Bloomsbury Academic. ISBN 978-1474298681.
