= Bill Griffiths (poet) =

British poet and scholar (1948–2007)

Photograph of Griffiths taken by Tom Raworth.

Brian William Bransom Griffiths (20 August 1948 – 13 September 2007), known as Bill Griffiths, was a poet and Anglo-Saxon scholar associated with the British Poetry Revival.

== Overview ==
Griffiths was born in Kingsbury, Middlesex, England. As a teenager, he became a Hells Angel; his experiences with bikers provided material for many early poems. From 1971, these poems were published in Poetry Review, under the editorship of Eric Mottram, and by Bob Cobbing's Writers Forum. He also collaborated on a number of performance poetry pieces with Cobbing and others.

Griffiths soon started his own imprint, Pirate Press, which published work by himself and other like-minded poets. In addition to Cobbing and other Writers Forum poets, Griffiths listed his early influences as Michael McClure, Muriel Rukeyser, John Keats, George Crabbe, Gerard Manley Hopkins, and Old English poetry.

In 1987, he obtained a Ph.D. in Old English from King's College London. He published a number of editions and translations of Old English texts and authored Aspects of Anglo-Saxon Magic.

Griffiths was a prolific poet who published widely in Britain and the United States. In later years he lived in Seaham, County Durham, and ran Amra Press, which published his poetry and books of local studies.

Griffiths' books of poetry from other publishers include A Tract Against The Giants (Coach House Press, Toronto, 1984), Rousseau and the Wicked (Invisible Books, London, 1996), Etruscan Reader 5 (with Tom Raworth and Tom Leonard) (Etruscan Books, Buckfastleigh, 1997), Nomad Sense (Talus Editions, London, 1998), A Book of Spilt Cities (Etruscan Books, 1999), Ushabtis (Talus, 2001) and Durham and other sequences (West House Books, 2002). A substantial collection of his work was also published in Future Exiles (Paladin 1992). In 2010, Reality Street released Collected Earlier Poems (1966 – 80).

== Life, work, and scholarship ==
Beginning in 1996 and up until his death, Griffiths worked with Bill Lancaster at the Centre for Northern Studies at Northumbria University, Newcastle. He became a highly active assistant editor to Lancaster's Northern Review, a Journal of Regional and Cultural Affairs, which lasted ten years. During this period, Griffiths published a series of books on north east dialect, beginning with North East Dialect, Survey and Word list and "North East Dialect, the Texts" in 1998. Published by the Centre for Northern Studies, these ran to several editions before culminating in A Dictionary of North East Dialect by Northumbria University Press in 2004. Griffiths drew upon his scholarship of Saxon literature and Old English, providing etymologies that drew upon sources as far back as the eighth century.

The centre was awarded a major grant from the Heritage Lottery Fund in 2005 to continue dialect research which facilitated the publication by Northumbria University Press of three more volumes of dialect studies: Stotties and Spicecake, the Story of North East Cooking, Pitmatic: the talk of the North East Coalfield (a volume that was featured heavily in the media and is credited with capturing for posterity the rapidly disappearing yet distinctive dialect of the northern coalfields), and 'Fishing and Folk: Life and Dialect on the North Sea Coast', this last published posthumously in 2008.

Griffiths was working with Bill Lancaster at the time of his death to secure funding for another dialect project on children's games and pastimes. In 2003, the centre was commissioned by Sage/Music North to catalogue the archive of Northern Sinfonia and produce a history of the orchestra for the opening of the Sage music centre. A highly skilled archivist and talented classical musician, Griffiths was considered the ideal person to do this work which was completed ahead of schedule. Subsequently, Northern Sinfonia, a Magic of its Own, was published in 2004. His last work at the centre was the cataloguing of the T. Dan Smith archive of taped recordings.

Of tangential interest to these projects, it could be noted that Griffiths organised an exhibition in his adopted home of Seaham which was seen by the Queen on her Golden Jubilee Tour and he published numerous small books and pamphlets dealing with his adopted community.

== Selected bibliography ==
- Collected Poems Volume 3 (1992 - 1996), Reality Street, Sussex 2016
- Collected Poems and Sequences (1981 - 1991), Reality Street, Sussex 2014
- Collected Earlier Poems (1966 – 80), Reality Street, Sussex 2010
- William Rowe (Ed.), The Salt Companion to Bill Griffiths (Salt Publishing, 2007)
- The Mud Fort, Salt Publishing, 2004
- Durham and other sequences, West House Books, 2002
- Ushabtis, Talus, 2001
- A Book of Spilt Cities, Etruscan Books, Burkfastleigh 1999
- Nomad Sense, Talus Editions, London, 1998
- Etruscan Reader 5, Etruscan Books, Buckfastleigh, 1997
- Rousseau and the Wicked, Invisible Books, London, 1996
- TALISMAN No. 16 Fall 1996 Special Boston/U.K. Issue: a journal of contemporary poetry and poetics
- Future Exiles, Paladin, 1992
