= Alexandra Sanmark =

Archaeologist of the Viking Age

Alexandra Sanmark FSA FRHistS
- Born: 1970 (age 55–56)
- Occupations: Archaeologist; Academic

Academic background
- Education: University College London
- Thesis: The Christianisation of Scandinavia: a comparative study (2006)

Academic work
- Discipline: Archaeology
- Sub-discipline: Early-medieval archaeology Iron Age Scandinavia; Viking archaeology
- Institutions: University of the Highlands and Islands; Uppsala University

Alexandra Sanmark FSA FRHistS (b. 1970) is an archaeologist specialising in Iron Age Scandinavia and the Viking Age.

== Career ==
Sanmark took undergraduate and postgraduate study at the University of London before gaining her PhD in 2006 on the Christianisation of Scandinavia from University College London. Sanmark is a Reader in Medieval Archaeology at the University of the Highlands and Islands and associate professor of archaeology at Uppsala University.

She was elected as a Fellow of the Society of Antiquaries of London on 2 February 2010, and as a Fellow of the Royal Historical Society in 2010.

== Select publications ==
- Sanmark, A. 2017. Viking Law and Order, Places and Rituals of Assembly in the Medieval North. Edinburgh University Press.
- Sanmark, A. 2014. "Christianity, Survival and Re-Emergence", Encyclopedia of Global Archaeology .
- Sanmark, A. 2013. "'Patterns of Assembly. Norse Thing Sites in Shetland' Debating the Thing in the North I, Selected Papers from Workshops Organized by f1
- The Assembly Project", Journal of the North Atlantic Special Volume 5.
- Sanmark, A. and Semple, S. 2013. "Assembly in North West Europe: collective concerns for early societies?", European Journal of Archaeology 16(3).
- Carver, M., Sanmark, A., and Semple, S. (eds) 2010. Signals of Belief in Early England: Anglo-Saxon Paganism Revisited. Oxbow.
- Sanmark, A. 2009–10. "The Case of the Greenlandic Assembly Sites", Journal of the North Atlantic Special Volume 2, 178–192.
