= Bald's Leechbook =

Medieval collection of medical remedies

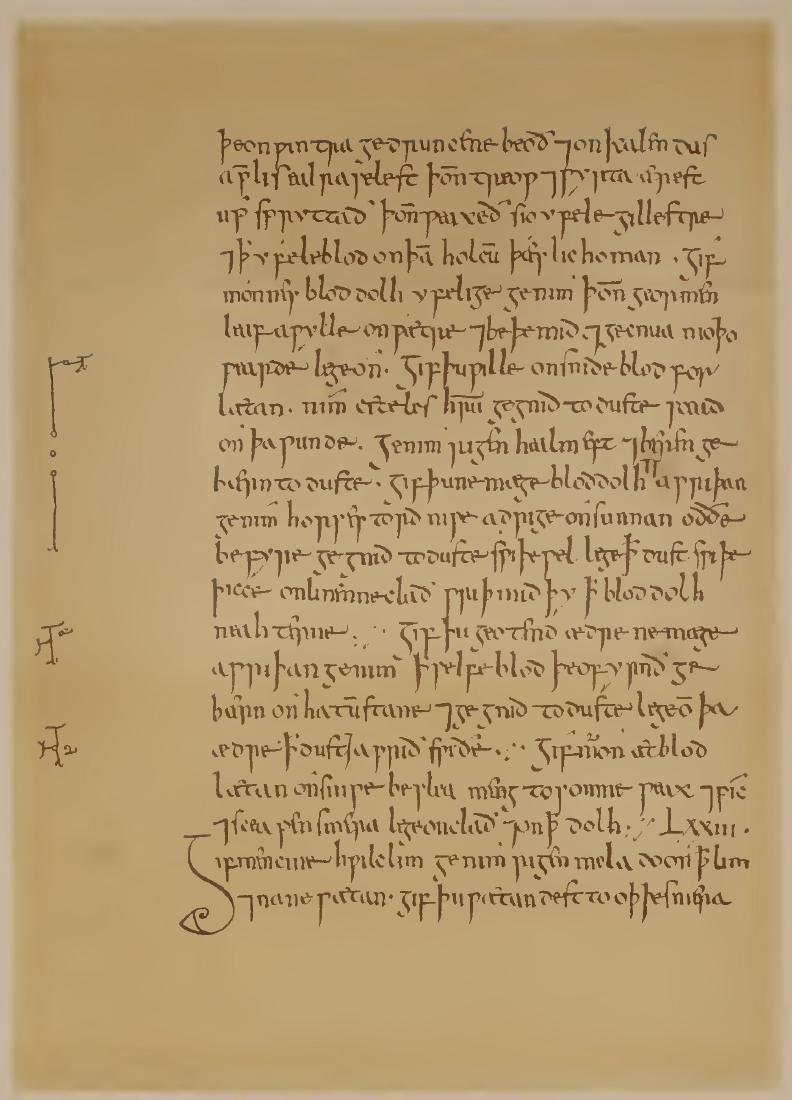
A facsimile page of Bald's Leechbook

Bald's Leechbook (also known as Medicinale Anglicum) is a medical text in Old English and Medieval Latin probably compiled in the mid-10th century, possibly under the influence of Alfred the Great's educational reforms.

The term Leechbook is not related to leeches as such, although they were used in ancient medicine, but a modernisation of the Old English word lǣċe-bōc ('book of medical prescriptions', literally Old English lǣċe 'physician' + bōc 'book').

The Leechbook's name comes from its owner; a Latin verse colophon at the end of the second book begins Bald habet hunc librum Cild quem conscribere iussit, meaning "Bald owns this book which he ordered Cild to compile."

The text survives in only one manuscript, which is in the British Library in London, England, and can be viewed in digitised form online. The manuscript contains a further medical text, called Leechbook III, which is also covered in this article.

== Structure and content ==
Both of the books of Bald's Leechbook are organised in a head-to-foot order; the first book deals with external maladies and the second with internal disorders. Cameron notes, "this separation of external and internal diseases may be unique in medieval medical texts".

Cameron notes, "in Bald's Leechbook is the only plastic surgery mentioned in Anglo-Saxon records". The recipe in question prescribes surgery for a cleft lip and palate.

Cameron also notes that of the Old English medical compilations "Leechbook III reflects most closely the medical practice of the Anglo-Saxons while they were still relatively free of Mediterranean influences," in contrast to Bald's Leechbook, which "shows a conscious effort to transfer to Anglo-Saxon practice what one physician considered most useful in native and Mediterranean medicine," and the Lacnunga, which is "a sort of commonplace book with no other apparent aim than to record whatever items of medical interest came to the scribe's attention".

Oswald Cockayne, who edited and translated the Leechbook in 1865, made note in his introduction of what he termed "a Norse element" in the text, and gave as example words such as torbegete, rudniolin, ons worm, and Fornets palm.

== Cures ==
One cure for headache was to bind a stalk of crosswort to the head with a red kerchief. Chilblains were treated with a mix of eggs, wine, and fennel root. Agrimony was cited as a cure for male impotence – when boiled in milk, it could excite a man who was "insufficiently virile"; when boiled in Welsh beer, it would have the opposite effect. The remedy for shingles comprised a potion using the bark of 15 trees: aspen, apple, maple, elder, willow, sallow, myrtle, wych elm, oak, blackthorn, birch, olive, dogwood, ash, and quickbeam.

A remedy for aching feet called for leaves of elder, waybroad and mugwort to be pounded together, applied to the feet, then the feet bound. In another, after offering a ritualistic cure for a horse in pain requiring the words "Bless all the works of the Lord of lords" to be inscribed on the handle of a dagger, the author adds that the pain may have been caused by an elf.

=== Modern applications ===
In March 2015 it was reported that Bald's eyesalve recipe – garlic, leek, wine, and the bile from a cow's stomach left in a brass bowl for nine days – was tested in vitro and in vivo and found to be as effective against methicillin-resistant Staphylococcus aureus (MRSA) as vancomycin, the antibiotic used for MRSA. The ingredients separately were not effective, but the combination was.

It has been suggested that a lot can be learned from medieval medicine because wounds must have been ubiquitous in agrarian societies: "If you cut yourself with a scythe, it was highly likely that you'd get an infection." In particular, leeches and maggots are returning to medical use in the 21st century.

== Contents and provenance of the manuscript ==
Bald's Leechbook and Leechbook III survive only in one manuscript, Royal 12 D. xvii, in the British Library, London and viewable online. The manuscript was written by the scribe who entered the batch of annals for 925–955 into the Parker Chronicle. This suggests that Royal 12 D. xvii is also from the mid-10th century. Since the annals were probably produced in Winchester, Royal 12 D. xvii was presumably produced there as well.

- ff. 1–6^{v} Table of Contents to Leechbook i; pr. Cockayne vol. 2, pp. 2–16
- ff. 6^{v}–58^{v} Leechbook i; pr. Cockayne vol. 2, pp. 18–156
- ff. 58^{v}–65 Table of Contents to Leechbook ii; pr Cockayne vol. 2, pp. 158–174
- ff. 65–109 Leechbook ii; 68 recipes. pr Cockayne 176–298. Cockayne provides missing chapter between 56 and 64 from London, BL, Harley 55. Chapter 64 is glossed as having been sent along with exotic medicines from Patriarch Elias of Jerusalem to Alfred the Great, which is the basis for the book's association with the Alfredian court.
- f. 109 A metrical Latin colophon naming Bald as the owner of the book, and Cild as the compiler.
- ff. 109–127^{v} "Leechbook iii." A collection of 73 medicinal recipes not associated with Bald due to its location after the metrical colophon.
- ff. 127^{v}–end De urinis ?
