= Godfrid Storms =

- Born: 4 May 1911; Sittard, Netherlands
- Died: 20 October 2003 (aged 92); Nijmegen, Netherlands
- Other name: Frits Storms
- Spouse: Gré Wilmink

Academic background
- Education: Catholic University of Nijmegen
- Thesis: Anglo-Saxon Magic (1948)
- Doctoral advisor: Aurelius Pompen

Academic work
- Discipline: Old and Middle English Literature
- Institutions: Catholic University of Nijmegen

Godfrid Storms (4 May 1911 – 20 October 2003) was a Dutch professor of Old and Middle English Literature at the Catholic University of Nijmegen. He published his seminal dissertation on Anglo-Saxon charms in 1948, superseding a work that had stood as the authority for forty years, before obtaining his professorship there in 1956. Among his many other works were articles on Beowulf and the Sutton Hoo ship-burial.

== Early life and education ==
Godfrid Storms, known as "Frits", was born in Sittard, Netherlands, on 4 May 1911. He was educated at Radboud University Nijmegen where he had Aurelius Pompen as his doctoral adviser, and on 4 June 1948 successfully defended his dissertation.

== Career ==
In 1956 Storms became a Professor of Old and Middle English Literature, also at Radboud University. During his time there he published many articles on the subject, notably The Subjectivity of the Style of Beowulf and Grammatical Expressions of Emotiveness. Other articles also took the Anglo-Saxon epic poem Beowulf as a subject, and another the Sutton Hoo ship-burial discovered in Suffolk in 1939. Among the doctoral students that Storm promoted was W. J. M. Bronzwaer (nl), in 1970, a year after Storms had visited the University of Nottingham as part of an exchange program between it and Radboud.

Storms continued to be known for Anglo-Saxon Magic, his 1948 dissertation which was soon thereafter published. The work comprised an anthropological and psychological discussion of "magic" as understood by the Anglo-Saxons, and a discussion of 86 Anglo-Saxon charms in Old English and Latin. A lengthy review by the Harvard Anglo-Saxonist Francis Peabody Magoun called it an "interesting and important" work that would supersede a work published by Felix Grendon in 1909. "All students of the Anglo-Saxon charms," wrote Magoun Jr., "will be grateful to Dr Storms for his edition, in all respects an advance on Grendon's once important study."

== Personal life ==
Storms had a wife, Gré Wilmink, as well as children, grandchildren, and a great-grandchild. His wife died before him; he himself died on 20 October 2003, at the age of 92, in Nijmegen.

== Publications ==
- Storms, Godfrid (1947). "An Anglo-Saxon Prescription from the Lacnunga". English Studies. XXVIII (1–6): 33–41. doi:10.1080/00138384708596781.
  - Correction: Storms, Godfrid (1947). "Notes and News". English Studies. XXVIII (1–6): 80. doi:10.1080/00138384708596789.
- Storms, Godfrid (1948). Anglo-Saxon Magic (PDF) (Ph.D.). Nijmegen: Centrale drukkerij N.V.
- Storms, Godfrid (1951). "Brief Mention". English Studies. XXXII (1–6): 141. doi:10.1080/00138385108596871.
- Storms, Godfrid (1952). "The Middle English Dictionary". English Studies. XXXIII: 257–259. doi:10.1080/00138385208596887.
- Storms, Godfrid (1956). "The Weakening of O.E. Unstressed i to e and the Date of Cynewulf". English Studies. XXXVII (1–6): 104–110. doi:10.1080/00138385608596971.
- Storms, Godfrid (1957a). Compounded Names of Peoples in Beowulf: A Study in the Diction of a Great Poet. Nijmegen: Dekker en van de Vegt.
- Storms, Godfrid (1957b). "Brief Mention". English Studies. XXXVIII (1–6): 286–287. doi:10.1080/00138385708597005.
- Storms, Godfrid (1958). "Brief Mention". English Studies. XXXIX (1–6): 237. doi:10.1080/00138385808597022.
- Storms, Godfrid (1959). "The figure of Beowulf in the O.E. Epic". English Studies. XX (1–6): 3–13. doi:10.1080/00138385908597026.
- Storms, Godfrid (1960). "A note on Chaucer's pronunciation of French u". English Studies. XLI: 305–308. doi:10.1080/00138386008597088.
- Storms, Godfrid (1961). "Review: The Proverbs of Alfred". English Studies. XLII: 28–30. doi:10.1080/00138386108597106.
- Storms, Godfrid (1961). "Ne say Þu hit Þin are3e PA(T) 204". English Studies. XLII: 304–305. doi:10.1080/00138386108597107.
- Storms, Godfrid (1963). "The Subjectivity of the Style of Beowulf". In Greenfield, Stanley B. (ed.). Studies in Old English Literature in Honor of Arthur G. Brodeur. Eugene, Oregon: University of Oregon Books. pp. 171–186.
- Storms, Godfrid (1964). "The Subjective and the Objective Form in Mdn English". English Studies. XLV (1–6): 57–63. doi:10.1080/00138386408597187.
- Storms, Godfrid (1966). "Brief Mention". English Studies. XLVII (1–6): 86. doi:10.1080/00138386608597267.
- Storms, Godfrid (1966). "That-clauses in Modern English". English Studies. XLVII: 249–270. doi:10.1080/00138386608597258.
- Storms, Godfrid (1 September 1970). "The Significance of Hygelac's Raid". Nottingham Medieval Studies. XIV. University of Nottingham: 3–26. doi:10.1484/J.NMS.3.44.
- Storms, Godfrid (1972). "Grendel the Terrible". Neuphilologische Mitteilungen. LXXIII (1/3). Modern Language Society of Helsinki: 427–436. JSTOR 43345373.
- Storms, Godfrid (1974). "The Author of Beowulf". Neuphilologische Mitteilungen. LXXV (1). Modern Language Society of Helsinki: 11–39. JSTOR 43345488.
- Storms, Godfrid (1975). "Chaucers Verhaal van de Molenaar". Handelingen van het Nederlands Filologencongres. 33: 1–12.
- Storms, Godfrid (1977). "Notes on Old English Poetry". Neophilologus. 61 (3). University of Nottingham: 439–442. doi:10.1007/BF01513853.
- Storms, Godfrid (1978). "The Sutton Hoo Ship Burial: An Interpretation". Berichten van de Rijksdienst voor het Oudheidkundig Bodemonderzoek. 28: 309–344.
- Storms, Godfrid (1999). "How did the Dene and the Geatas get into Beowulf?". English Studies. LXXX (1): 46–49. doi:10.1080/00138389908599164.
- Storms, Godfrid (2002). "Review: Beowulf: A New Translation". English Studies. LXXXIII (2): 176–177. doi:10.1076/enst.83.2.166.9557.
  - Republished as Storms, Godfrid (2012). "Review: Beowulf: A New Translation". In Schulman, Jana K. & Szarmach, Paul E. (eds.). Beowulf at Kalamazoo: Essays on Translation and Performance. Kalamazoo: Medieval Institute Publications, Western Michigan University. pp. 374–375. ISBN 978-1-58044-152-0.
- Storms, Godfrid (2012). "Review: Beowulf: A New Translation". In Schulman, Jana K.; Szarmach, Paul E. (eds.). Beowulf at Kalamazoo: Essays on Translation and Performance. Kalamazoo, Michigan: Medieval Institute Publications. ISBN 978-1-58044-152-0.

== Bibliography ==
- Bronzwaer, W. J. M. (1970). Tense in the Novel: An Investigation of Some Potentialities of Linguistic Criticism (PDF) (Ph.D.). Groningen: Wolters-Noordhoff Publishing.
- "Frits Storms is overleden". Knipselkrant: een selectie met nieuwtjes en wetenswaardigheden uit en over Ameland (jaargang 2003 en 2004).
- Magoun, Francis P. Jr. (January 1953). "Anglo-Saxon Magic by Godfrid Storms". Speculum. XXIII (1). The University of Chicago Press: 203–212. doi:10.2307/2847219. JSTOR 2847219.
- Thorpe, Lewis (1 September 1970). "Editorial". Nottingham Medieval Studies. XIV. University of Nottingham: 1–2. doi:10.1484/j.nms.5.147636.
