= Neil Price (archaeologist) =

English archaeologist

Neil Stuppel Price
- Born: 1965 (age 60–61)
- Education: UCL Institute of Archaeology (BA); Uppsala University (PhD)
- Known for: The Viking Way (book)
- Scientific career
- Fields: Archaeology (especially the Viking Age)
- Thesis: The Viking Way: Religion and War in Late Iron Age Scandinavia (2002)
- Website: www.uu.se/en/contact-and-organisation/staff?query=N96-2633

Neil Stuppel Price is an English archaeologist specialising in the study of Viking Age Scandinavia and the archaeology of shamanism. Since 2014 he is a professor in the Department of Archaeology and Ancient History at Uppsala University, Sweden.

Born in south-west London, Price went on to gain a BA in Archaeology at the University of London, before writing his first book, The Vikings in Brittany, which was published in 1989. He undertook his doctoral research from 1988 through to 1992 at the University of York, before moving to Sweden, where he completed his PhD at the University of Uppsala in 2002. In 2001, he edited an anthology entitled The Archaeology of Shamanism for Routledge, and the following year published and defended his doctoral thesis, The Viking Way. The Viking Way would be critically appraised as one of the most important studies of the Viking Age and pre-Christian religion by other archaeologists like Matthew Townend and Martin Carver. In 2017 Price was elected a Corresponding Fellow of the Royal Society of Edinburgh (CorrFRSE).

== Biography ==
Price began his archaeological career in 1983, working for the Museum of London in excavating Roman and medieval sites around the Greater London area. He subsequently began studying for a BA in the subject in 1988, at the Institute of Archaeology, then a part of the University of London. It was here that he developed a particular interest in the early medieval period and the Viking Age, and undertook fieldwork in Britain, Germany, Malta and the Caribbean.

Price started his doctoral research at the University of York's Department of Archaeology from October 1988 through to May 1992. Under the supervision of the archaeologists Steve Roskams and Richard Hall, Price had initially focused his research on the Anglo-Scandinavian tenements at 16–22 Coppergate in York, although eventually moved away from this to focus on archaeology within Scandinavia itself. Personal circumstances meant that Price was unable to finish his doctoral thesis at York, and in 1992 he emigrated to Sweden, where he spent the following five years working as a field archaeologist. Despite his full-time employment, he continued to be engaged in archaeological research in a private capacity, publishing a series of academic papers and presenting others at conferences. In 1996 he joined the Department of Archaeology at the University of Uppsala as a research scholar, beginning full-time work there the following year. At Uppsala, he went on to complete his doctoral thesis and gain his PhD under the supervision of Anne-Sofie Gräslund.

== Bibliography ==
=== Books ===
Title	Year	Publisher	ISBN
The Vikings in Brittany	1989	Viking Society for Northern Research (London)	
The Archaeology of Shamanism	2001	Routledge (London)	
The Viking Way: Religion and War in Late Iron Age Scandinavia	2002	Department of Archaeology and Ancient History, Uppsala University (Uppsala)	91-506-1626-9
The Viking Way: Religion and War in the Later Iron Age of Scandinavia, 2nd edition	2017	Oxbow Books (Oxford)	978-1-84217-260-5
The Vikings	2016	Routledge (London & New York)	978-0-41534-349-7
Odin's Whisper: Death and the Vikings	2016	Reaktion Books (London)	978-1-78023-290-4
Children of Ash and Elm: A History of the Vikings	2020	Basic Books (New York)	978-0-46509-698-5
The Vikings (Peoples of the Ancient World)	2023	Routledge (London & New York)	978-0-41534-350-3
The Sea-King and the Sorceress: Life and Death in the Viking Age	2026	Basic Books (New York)	978-1-54160-304-2

=== Articles ===
- Price, Neil & Mortimer, Paul (2004). "An Eye for Odin? Divine Role-Playing in the Age of Sutton Hoo". European Journal of Archaeology. 17 (3). European Association of Archaeologists: 517–538. doi:10.1179/1461957113Y.0000000050. S2CID 161907810.
