= Martin Carver =

British archaeologist

- Born: Martin Oswald Hugh Carver; 8 July 1941 (age 85)

Academic background
- Education: Royal Military College, Shrivenham; University of Durham

Academic work
- Discipline: Archaeology
- Sub-discipline: Field archaeology; early medieval; Sutton Hoo; archaeology of the United Kingdom
- Institutions: Birmingham University Field Archaeology Unit; University of York
- Doctoral students: Helen Geake

Martin Oswald Hugh Carver (born 8 July 1941) is Emeritus Professor of Archaeology at the University of York, England, director of the Sutton Hoo Research Project and a leading exponent of new methods in excavation and survey. He specialises in the archaeology of early Medieval Europe. He has an international reputation for his excavations at Sutton Hoo, on behalf of the British Museum and the Society of Antiquaries and at the Pictish monastery at Portmahomack Tarbat, Easter Ross, Scotland. He has undertaken archaeological research in England, Scotland, France, Italy and Algeria.

== Early life ==
Carver was born on 8 July 1941 to John Hobart Carver and Jocelyn Louisa Grace Carver (née Tweedie). He was the grandson of Oswald Carver. He was educated at Ladycross School, a Catholic preparatory school in Seaford, East Sussex, and then Wellington College, a private school in Crowthorne, Berkshire.

== Military service ==
Having graduated from the Royal Military Academy Sandhurst, Carver was commissioned into the Royal Tank Regiment, British Army, as a second lieutenant on 29 July 1961. He was promoted to lieutenant in January 1963, and to captain in July 1967. In 1969, he was serving as Adjutant of the 4th Royal Tank Regiment.

On 1 July 1972, Carver retired from the British Army in the rank of captain.

== Academic career ==
Carver practised as a freelance archaeologist (1973–1986), setting up the Birmingham University Field Archaeology Unit (BUFAU), later called Birmingham Archaeology at the University of Birmingham to carry out archaeological contract work. He chairs Field Archaeology Specialists Ltd (FAS), now FAS Heritage, that was created in 1992. FAS Heritage is currently based in York and carries out archaeological research and heritage work in England and Scotland. Carver was the first secretary of the Institute of Field Archaeology, now Institute for Archaeologists. He has developed a number of procedures for archaeological investigation and analytical methods for writing up excavations, and has championed evaluation and project design as key elements in "value-led" archaeology.

In 1986 Carver was appointed Professor of Archaeology at the University of York (Head of Department 1986–1996; Emeritus 2008–). At York he introduced courses on World Archaeology and Field Archaeology, conducted research investigations at Sutton Hoo and Portmahomack, and researched Early Medieval Britain (5-11th century), publishing a comprehensive synthesis of his findings in 2019 as Formative Britain. He has served on UK, British, Irish, Danish and European research councils.

Since becoming emeritus Carver has been researching in early medieval Sicily with Alessandra Molinari (University of Rome Tor Vergata) and Girolamo Fiorentino (University of Lecce).

Carver was editor of the world archaeology journal Antiquity from 2002 to 2012, personally editing some 800 articles.

Carver is a director of The Sutton Hoo Ship's Company, which aims to build a full-size and seaworthy replica of the Anglo-Saxon ship found in Mound 1 at Sutton Hoo.

== Broadcasting ==
From 1986, Carver presented four episodes of the BBC 2 documentary series Chronicle (British TV programme), which looked at his work at Sutton Hoo and also explained technological developments in archaeology. In the episode first broadcast 16 August 1989, Carver went aboard Edda, a replica of the Viking Oseberg Ship, which promptly sank, and the incident became a favourite anecdote in his public lectures.

== Honours ==
On 8 January 1981, Carver was elected Fellow of the Society of Antiquaries of London (FSA). On St Andrew's Day 2011, he was elected Honorary Fellow of the Society of Antiquaries of Scotland (Hon FSA Scot). On 23 July 2020, he was elected Fellow of the British Academy (FBA), the United Kingdom's national academy for the humanities and social sciences.

== Bibliography ==
=== Books ===
- Underneath English Towns (Batsford, 1987)
- Arguments in Stone. Archaeological research and the European town in the First Millennium AD (Oxbow, 1993)
- Sutton Hoo: Burial Ground of Kings? (BMP, 1998, 2002, 2005, 2007, 2009, 2011, 2014)
- Sutton Hoo: A Seventh-Century Princely Burial Ground and Its Context] (British Museum Publications, 2005)
- (ed) The Age of Sutton Hoo (Boydell Press, 1992, 1994)
- Archaeological Value and Evaluation (SAP, Mantova, 2003)
- (ed.) The Cross Goes North: Processes of Conversion in Northern Europe, AD 300-1300 (ed.) (Boydell Press, 2003)
- The Birth of a Borough. Archaeological studies of Anglo-Saxon Stafford (Boydell, 2010)
- (ed.)Signals of Belief. Anglo-Saxon Paganism revisited (Oxbow, 2010)
- Portmahomack Monastery of the Picts (EUP, 2008, 2016)
- Portmahomack on Tarbat Ness : changing ideologies in north-east Scotland, Sixth to Sixteenth Century AD by Martin Carver, Justin Garner-Lahire and Cecily Spall (Society of Antiquaries of Scotland, 2016)
- Archaeological Investigation (Routledge, 2009)
- Making Archaeology Happen: Design versus Dogma (Routledge, 2011)
- (ed) The Archaeology of Medieval Europe Twelfth to Sixteenth Centuries(Aarhus University Press, 2011)
- The Sutton Hoo Story. Encounters with Early England (Boydell 2017)
- Formative Britain. An Archaeology of Britain, fifth to eleventh century(Routledge, 2019)

=== Critical studies and reviews of Carver's work ===
Portmahomack on Tarbat Ness:

- Hodges, Richard (September 2017). "Picts, pins, stones and bones". Reviews. History Today. 67 (9): 92–93.

Academic offices
Preceded by Caroline Malone	Editor of Antiquity; 2003–2012	Succeeded by Chris Scarre
