= March Malaen =

Evil horse from Celtic folklore associated with the Devil and witchcraft

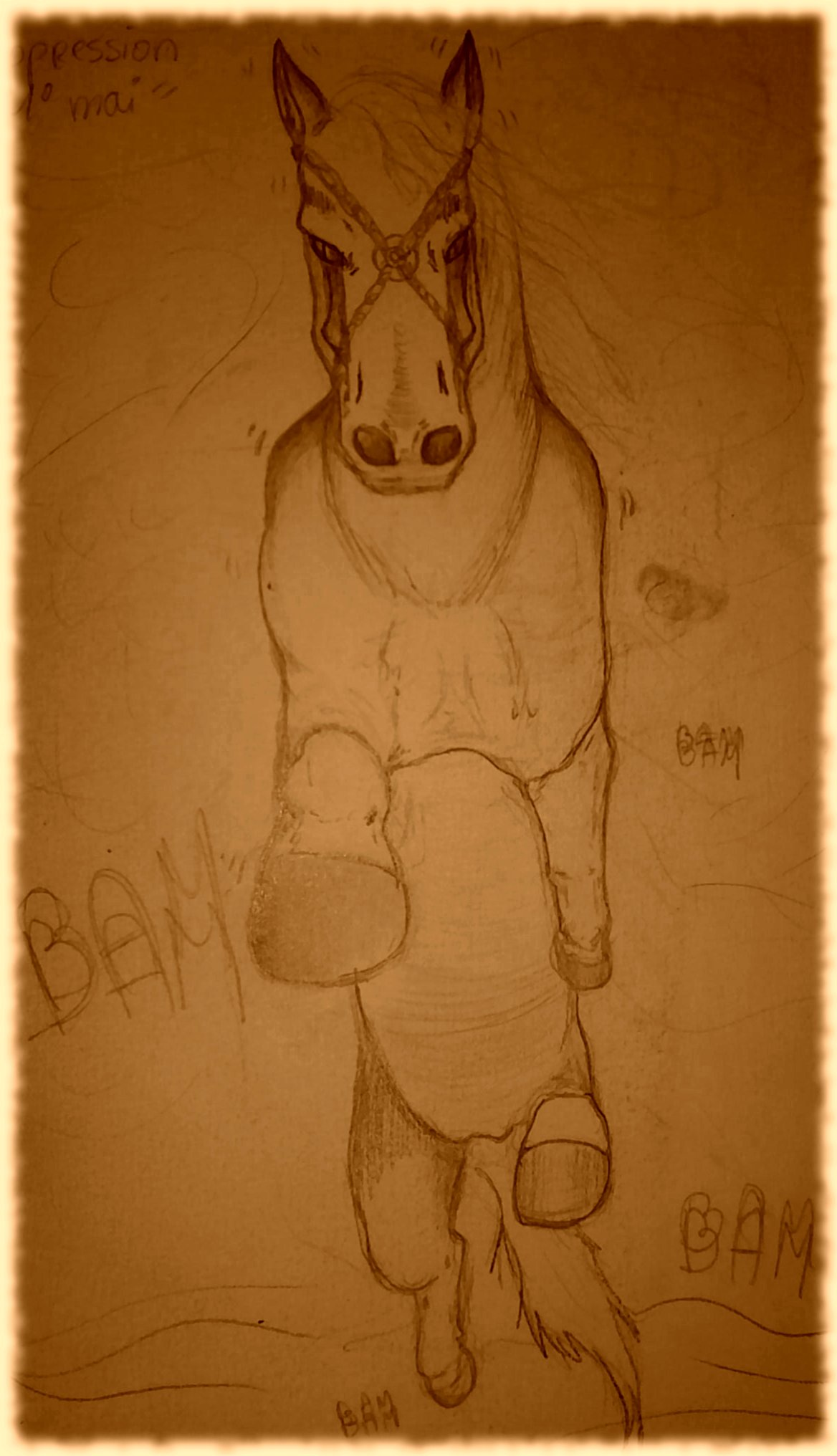

Creature information
- Grouping: Popular folklore
- Folklore: Celtic

Origin
- First attested: 1733
- Country: Wales
- Details: Horse

The March Malaen is cited in Celtic folklore as an evil horse associated with the Devil and witchcraft, whose mythical or historical origins remain obscure. In the 18th century, its tradition was said to be widespread among the Welsh, through a popular expression and the Gallic goddess Andarta.

From 1807, with the publication of Iolo Morganwg's Welsh Triads, March Malaen became a creature of Welsh mythology, and one of the three scourges of the "Isle of Brittany". This reference is repeated in Joseph Loth's 1889 translation of the Mabinogion, according to which the March Malaen came to the kingdom from across the sea on May 1st. It is associated with the tale of Lludd a Llefelys, where, in more recent translations, the first plague fought by King Lludd Llaw Eraint is the arrival of the Corannyeit people.

Nineteenth-century authors, in the midst of the Celtic era, comment on the horse in various ways, suggesting that it could be the Questing Beast of Arthurian legend, that May 1st was feared by the ancient Welsh as the day of the March Malaen's appearance, or that it was the memory of a fomented king. March Malaen is absent from most recent publications.

== Etymology ==
March Malaen is a name from Wales pronounced in Welsh [marx maˈlaɪn]. According to the Dictionnaire des symboles (Dictionary of symbols), Malaen appears to derive from the Latin malignus. The French Mythological Society translated March Malaen's name as "malignant horse", in 1989.

Several 19th-century authors, including Anatole Le Braz, believe that March Malaen translates as "Malaen's horse", but James Hastings assumes that March meant an evil king, and Malaen something demonic. There is also the older form March Malen, which translates as "the stallion of Malen". (Note: The original version of The steed of Malen)

The Indo-European root Mar seems to designate liquid expanses such as the sea and marshes, and to have given rise to marah among Celto-Germanic peoples, marc'h (hence King Marc'h), and the words mark and marca in Celtic languages, then marko and marka in Gaulish. All these words are related to the horse. Alexander Haggerty Krappe has also studied the etymology of the word "nightmare", noting that this word, literally translated as "mare of the night", can be related to those mentioned above.

== Mentions ==
There are two versions of this creature. The first refers to the March Malen as the "Devil's horse" in folklore. The second refers to the March Malaen in a version of the Triads of Welsh mythology mentioned by Iolo Morganwg.

=== The Devil's horse as a creature of folklore ===
The earliest known source on the March Malen dates back to 1733; it tells of a man who tried to harness the evil (March Malen) for his own benefit, but the beast broke free to trample him. It then became associated with the goddess Minerva (Athena) and Pegasus, before returning to Wales and giving rise to popular Welsh expressions. In later publications, in 1753 and after, this animal was linked to the Devil, to witchcraft, to the Gallic goddess Andarta, and to the popular Welsh expression: A gasgler as farch Malen dan er dor yd a, literally translated as "What is collected on Mallen horseback will find its way under its belly", and more commonly as "What is got on the devil's back will be spent under his belly". The Devil's horse is said to have given rise to a number of proverbial expressions, such as "il a disparu sur le cheval de Malaen", (Note: "It has disappeared on Malaen's horse") which in Wales around 1820 referred to what had been thrown away or wasted.

In 1863, a magazine stated that "Malen, among the Bretons, was a popular name for the furious Andraste, or, as the vulgar would say, the Devil's Lady". Malen's horse was then seen as the magical mount on which witches usually traveled through the air, and the Welsh proverb is said to be derived from this vision. In a posthumous work published in 1891, Robert Owen says that the Welsh saw the figure of a woman riding this mount in the sky in the company of witches as a demonstration of the Devil's power, under the influence of canon law. It's hard to say when the English first gave the Devil the form of a horse, but the Welsh seem to have been familiar with the figure for a long time. John Rhys likens a story in the Grail Quest, in which Peredurus attempts to ride a demonic stallion, to the figure of the diabolical horse. He also cites the black stallion of Moro, ridden by Gwynn ap Nudd during the hunt for Twrch Trwyth, and the horse-eared King Marc'h. Moreover, as Anatole Le Braz reports, the figure of the demonic horse is known in the folklore of many Celtic countries, as Welsh folklore mentions numerous stories of revenants, some of whom appear mounted on headless horses to run the countryside all night long, as well as the psychopomp horse of death, which is white or black with a fiery gaze. The Devil transforms himself into a horse in Cornish and Breton folklore, and in Ireland, a popular belief has it that an evil spirit will prowl around a house where someone has recently died in the form of "a horse with a big tail".

=== March Malaen as a scourge in triads of Britain ===
Under the pen of literary forger Iolo Morganwg in 1807, the March Malaen became associated with the story of Lludd Llaw Eraint and the tale of Lludd a Llefelys, of which it forms a variant. His name was mentioned in the 1820 edition of Cambro-Briton and in the Mabinogion edition of the Red Book of Hergest with variants from the White Book of Rhydderch (as well as their 1975 reprint), which include extracts from Welsh Triads. They read (Note: Triad 114 after The Cambro-Briton version in 1820.) that "three oppressions came to this island [the Isle of Brittany] and disappeared". In Joseph Loth's 1889 translation, the first is "the oppression of the March Malaen (Malaen's horse), called the oppression of the first of May". The second oppression is that of the "dragon of Pryden" (dragon of Great Britain), and the third that of the magician, the half-apparent man. Both sources also state that the first oppression [the March-Malaen] came from across the sea.

Whether under the name March Malaen or March Malen, this association of the creature with the Welsh Triads is absent from the vast majority of more recent works, (Note: Like Pierre-Yves Lambert's version of the Mabinogion, published by Gallimard coll. "L'aube des peuples" in 1993, which was produced to correct Joseph Loth's errors. Pierre-Yves Lambert states that "Joseph Loth was too dependent on the philological tradition of 19th century Welsh; his commentary, which was intended to be both historical and linguistic, has the particular disadvantage of making too extensive use of documents invented by Iolo Morganwg in the early 19th century".) where the first scourge fought by Lludd Llaw Eraint is that of the Corannyeit.

A 1989 bulletin of the Société de mythologie française attributes Celtic mythology to the March Malaen.

== Comments ==
The origin of March Malaen is "shrouded in mystery", and is the subject of few reviews, most of which date back to the Celtic period in the 19th century. This makes it difficult to know whether it originates from historical fact, myth or Iolo Morganwg's reworking of older publications.

The March Malaen associated with Lludd Llaw Eraint in Iolo Morganwg's version of the Welsh Triads has been the subject of comments highlighting the fact that the creature was able to cross the sea, or that it moved at a "snail's pace". As for its origin, William Rees suggests an event that took place in England during the mythological ages, and John Rhys thinks it may be linked to King Marc'h, or according to a 1993 publication, to a horse-god of the same name, who later took on human form under the guise of King Marc'h. In 1901, Ferdinand Lot speculated that "the March Malaen of the Welsh" might also be the Questing Beast of Arthurian legend.

Several authors point to the similarity between the March Malaen and More or Margg, a legendary Irish king who married the daughter of the king of Fir Morca and, like King Marc'h, possessed horse ears. He levied a tribute on corn and milk in Ireland. This last point seems to fit in with the May 1st date and the fact that March Malaen came "from across the sea"

The demonic horse of Malgis and the March Malaen may also have something in common. According to an 1820 publication, one of the three recognized demons of the Isle of Britain, Melen, or Malen, mentioned in another triad, is also the March Malen and may correspond to the Bellona of ancient mythology, whose name seems to have some affinity with "Prydain".

== Symbolism and survival ==
The March Malaen is cited in the Dictionnaire des symboles as a horse of death and nightmare. Described as a "fantastic monster, enemy of the Bretons", its cry, heard on the first of May, is said to have caused great calamities. It's possible that March Malaen gave rise to the nightmare manifestations mentioned in folklore, such as cauquemare and mare, but also to the English word nightmare, (Note: The Nightmare is also a fantastic role-playing creature with the appearance of a black horse with fiery manes.) and the French cauchemar.

Anatole Le Braz relates a Breton tale of a drunkard named Alanic, who invoked the Devil and saw a "devil's horse with a red mane hanging down to the ground" appear. He drew a parallel with the March Malaen quoted in Loth's translation.

== See also ==
- Questing Beast
- Cheval Mallet
- List of fictional horses

== Bibliography ==
- Baxter, William; Lhuyd, Edward (1733). Glossarium antiquitatum britannicarum : sive, Syllabus etymogicus antiquitatum veteris Britanniae atque Iberniae, temporibus Romanorum. Auctore Willielmo Baxter...Accedunt...Edvardi Luidii...De fluviorum, montium, urbium, &c, in Britanniâ nominibus, adversaria posthuma (in Latin). impensis T. Woodward.
- The Cambro-Briton. Vol. 1. J. Limbird. 1820.
- Cambrian quarterly magazine and Celtic repertory. Vol. 3. Pub. for the proprietors by H. Hughes. 1831. p. 25.
- Algernon, Herbert (1836). Britannia after the Romans : being an attempt to illustrate the religious and political revolutions of that province in the fifth and succeeding centuries. H.G. Bohn.
- Faux, Dr (1863). La Picardie, revue historique, archéologique & littéraire (in French). Vol. 9. Delattre-Lenoel. p. 25.
- Loth, Joseph (1889). Les Mabinogion (in French). Vol. 2. Thorin. p. 278. and its re-edition: Loth, Joseph (1975). Les Mabinogion du Livre rouge de Hergest avec les variantes du livre blanc de Rhydderch: traduits du gallois avec une introduction, un commentaire explicatif et des notes critiques (in French). Vol. 2. Slatkine.
- Collectif (1901). Romania: recueil trimestriel consacré à l'étude des langues et des littératures romanes (in French). Vol. 30. Société des amis de la Romania.
- Le Braz, Anatole; Dottin, Georges; Marillier, Léon (1928). La légende de la mort chez les Bretons armoricains (in French). Vol. 2. Honoré Champion., and its re-edition : Le Braz, Anatole (2009). La Legende de La Mort (in French). BiblioBazaar, LLC. ISBN 978-1-116-13652-4.
- Chevalier, Jean; Gheerbrant, Alain (1982). Dictionnaire des symboles (in French) (1 ed.). p. 226.
- Rhys, John (1971). Celtic folklore: Welsh and Manx. Forgotten Books. ISBN 978-1-60506-170-2.
- Milin, Gaël (1991). Le Roi Marc aux oreilles de cheval (in French). Vol. 197 de Publications romanes et françaises. Genève: Librairie Droz. p. 138. ISBN 978-2-600-02886-8.
- Dag'Naud, Alain (1993). Lieux insolites et secrets du Finistère (in French). Éditions Jean-paul Gisserot. p. 18. ISBN 978-2-87747-103-9.
- Rees, William (1854). The literary remains of the rev. thomas price carnhnanaur. Vol. 1. Londres: Longman et co.
- Rhys, John (2004) [1886]. Lectures on the Origin and Growth of Religion as Illustrated by Celtic Heathendom. Kessinger Publishing. ISBN 978-1-4191-7326-4.
- Owen, Robert (2009) [1891]. The Kymry Their Origin, History, and International Relations. Read Books. ISBN 978-1-4446-3526-3.
- Hastings, James (2003) [1912]. Encyclopedia of Religion and Ethics, part 9: Hibbert lectures. Kessinger Publishing. ISBN 978-0-7661-3680-9.
- Société de mythologie française (1989). "156–159". Bulletin de la Société de mythologie française (in French).
- MacCulloch, John Arnott (1996). Celtic Mythology. Academy Chicago. ISBN 978-0-89733-433-4.
- MacCulloch, John Arnott (2008). The Mythology of All Races. Vol. 3. BiblioBazaar, LLC. ISBN 978-0-559-45768-5.
