= Joseph Loth =

French linguist and historian

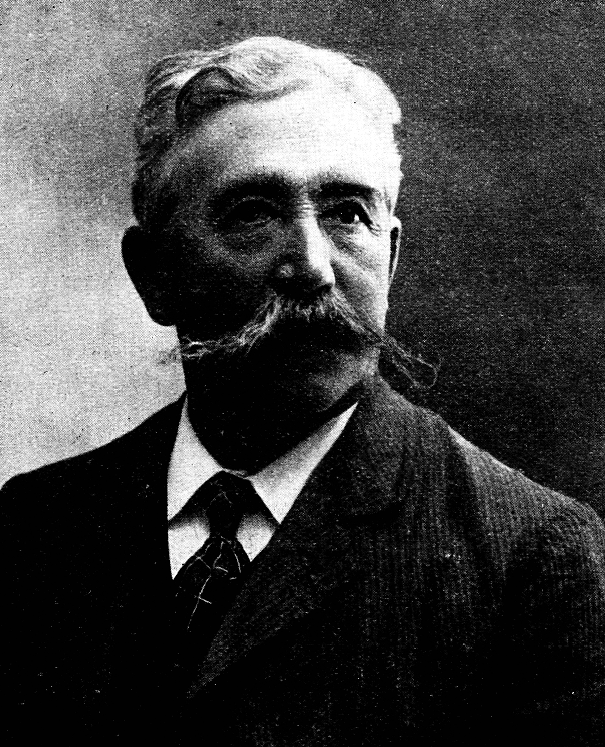
- Born: 27 December 1847; Guémené-sur-Scorff, France
- Died: 1 April 1934 (aged 86)

Academic work
- Discipline: history; linguistics
- Institutions: Rennes University; Collège de France
- Main interests: Celtic languages
- Notable works: Annales de Bretagne

Joseph Loth (27 December 1847 – 1 April 1934) was a French linguist and historian who specialised in the study of Celtic languages.

== Early life ==
Loth was born in Guémené-sur-Scorff, Brittany. After his studies at Sainte-Anne-d'Auray, he became a teacher at Pontivy, then Quimper and Saumur until the outbreak of the Franco-Prussian War in 1870. After the end of the conflict, he worked in various institutions in Paris. At this time, he made the acquaintance of Henri d'Arbois de Jubainville, who encouraged him to study Celtic languages.

== Career ==
In 1883 he was appointed to the Faculty of Arts at Rennes University, where he taught Celtic. That same year he founded the journal Annales de Bretagne, in which he published numerous studies and edited until 1910. He was appointed professor at the Collège de France in 1910 and was elected member of the Académie des Inscriptions et Belles-Lettres in 1919.

Loth published numerous articles in the Revue Celtique, re-edited Pierre de Chalons' Breton-French dictionary and translated into French important Celtic literature including the Mabinogion. He was also an early supporter of the detailed study of variations in local dialects.

== Award and achievements ==
Loth developed an influential model of the historical expansion of the Breton language into France. The farthest limit of spoken Breton is known as the "Loth line". It runs from Mont-Saint-Michel, through Hédé, and on to the west of Rennes to reach the Loire.

He received an honorary doctorate (LL.D) from the University of Glasgow in June 1901.

== Writings ==
- L'Émigration Bretonne en Armorique du Ve au VII siècle de notre ère, Rennes 1883 réédition Slatkine Reprints Paris-Genève-Gex 1980 (ISBN 2051001022)
- Vocabulaire vieux-breton, 1884
- Remarques sur le bas vannetais, 1886
- Le Mabinogi de Kulhwch et Olwen, tiré à part de la Revue de Bretagne et de Vendée, mars / avril / mai 1888, Éd. Prud'homme, Saint-Brieuc.
- Le Dialecte de l'Île aux Moines, 1893, (réédité et corrigé par Patrick Le Besco, Ar Skol vrezoneg/Emgleo Breiz, Brest, 1999)
- Chrestomathie bretonne
