= Andarta =

Celtic goddess from Gaul

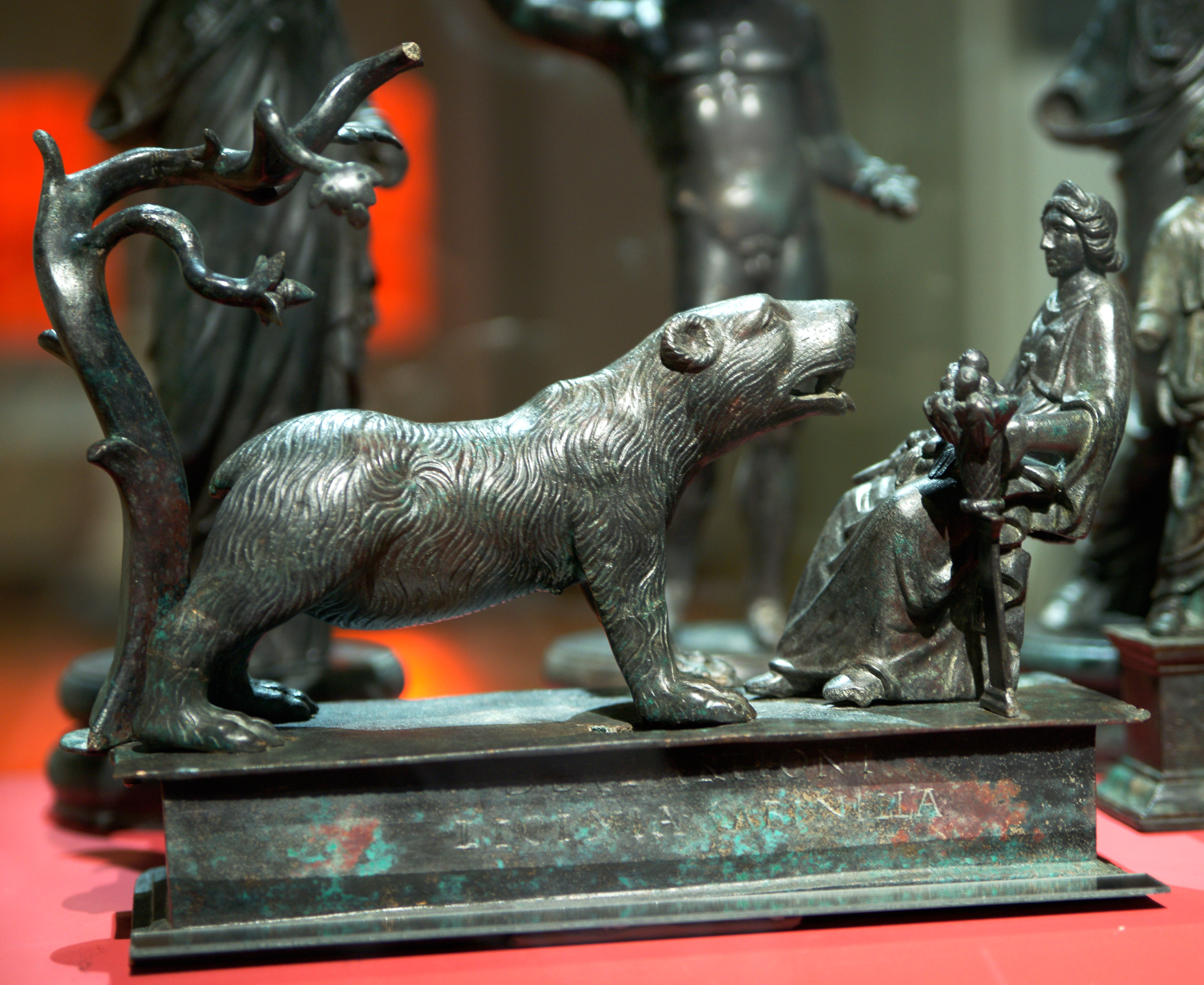

Andarta was a Celtic goddess worshiped in southern Gaul. Inscriptions invoking her name have been found in and around modern Die, within the territory of the Vocontii in Southern France.

== Name ==
The Gaulish theonym Andarta is traditionally derived from the Gaulish word for 'bear', artio, attached to an intensifying prefix and-. On this basis, the name has been interpreted as 'big she-bear' or 'mighty she-bear', or as Ursa Major. Blanca María Prósper finds this interpretation unconvincing on semantic and syntactic grounds, and instead interprets the name as 'Well-fixed' or 'Staying-firm', from a Proto-Indo-European prefix *h₂ndʰi- (or *h₁ndo-) combined with the participial element *-h₂-rtó ('fixed, composed, built').

Some scholars have posited that she may have been a counterpart of the Celtic bear goddess, Artio. On etymological grounds, the god Mercurius Artaios has also been linked to Andarta, although this has been criticised since Artaios is only attested further north in Isère.

== Cult ==
The cult of Andarta emerged at Die toward the end of the 1st century AD and subsequently spread in and around the settlement. In the late 2nd century, the cult of Cybele as the 'Great Mother of gods' was introduced in the area and experienced significant growth during the first half of the 3rd century AD. In 1912, Henri Graillot proposed that the two goddesses ultimately merged, with Andarta being hypostatized as Cybele. Benoît Rossignol, however, argues that Andarta and the Great Mother more likely coexisted within the official pantheon at Die without merging or displacing one another, in accordance with the dynamics of polytheistic religion.

== Epigraphy ==
Andarta is attested by seven votive inscriptions, all dedicated to Dea Augusta Andarta and dated to c. 150–200 AD. These inscriptions were found in or near the town of Die (Drôme), within the territory of the Vocontii, and associate the goddess with aspects of Victory, as indicated by the epithet Augusta. Scholars generally agree that the toponym Die, later attested as Civitas Dea Vocontiorum in 333 AD, derives from the Dea element of the local tutelary goddess.

Text	Find-spot	Divine name(s)	Translation	Reference	Comments
Deae Andartae [...]	Eygluy-Escoulin (Drôme)	Andarta	To the goddess Andarta ...	CIL XII, 1554	Fragmentary.
Deae Aug(ustae) Anda[rtae] [...]	Sainte-Croix (Drôme)	Andarta	To the goddess Augusta Anda[rta] ...	CIL XII, 1555	Fragmentary. The theonym is restored.
Deae Aug(ustae) Andartae L(ucius) Carisius Serenus IIIIIIvir Aug(ustalis) v(otum) s(olvit) l(ibens) m(erito)	Die (Drôme)	Andarta	To the goddess Augusta Andarta, Lucius Carisius Serenus, sevir Augustalis, fulfilled his vow willingly and deservedly.	CIL XII, 1556	Also published as ILS 4696.
Deae Aug(ustae) Andartae T(itus) Dexius Zosimus [...]	Die (Drôme)	Andarta	To the goddess Augusta Andarta, Titus Dexius Zosimus ...	CIL XII, 1557	Fragmentary.
De[ae] Aug(ustae) Andartae Q(uintus) Iul(ius) Antoninus	Die (Drôme)	Andarta	To the goddess Augusta Andarta, Quintus Iulius Antoninus.	CIL XII, 1558	= ILN VII 3.
De[ae] Aug(ustae) Andartae M(arcus) Iulius Theodorus	Die (Drôme)	Andarta	To the goddess Augusta Andarta, Marcus Iulius Theodorus.	CIL XII, 1558	= ILN VII 4.
Deae Andartae Aug(ustae) Sext(us) Plutatius Paternus ex voto	Aurel (Drôme)	Andarta	To the goddess Andarta Augusta, Sextus Plutatius Paternus, in fulfilment of a vow.	CIL XII, 1559	Note the order Andartae Augustae. The nomen is cut PLVTAAIVS on the stone, for Plutatius.
Deae Aug(ustae) Andartae M(arcus) Pomp(eius) Primitiv(u)s ex voto	Die (Drôme)	Andarta	To the goddess Augusta Andarta, Marcus Pompeius Primitivus, in fulfilment of a vow.	CIL XII, 1560	
[D]eae Aug(ustae) [Andartae(?)] [S]ex(tus) Matici[us ...]	Luc-en-Diois (Drôme)	Andarta (?)	To the goddess Augusta [Andarta(?)], Sextus Maticius ...	ILGN 230	The restoration of the theonym is conjectural. = ILN VII 180.
