= Cheval Mallet =

Horse in French folklore

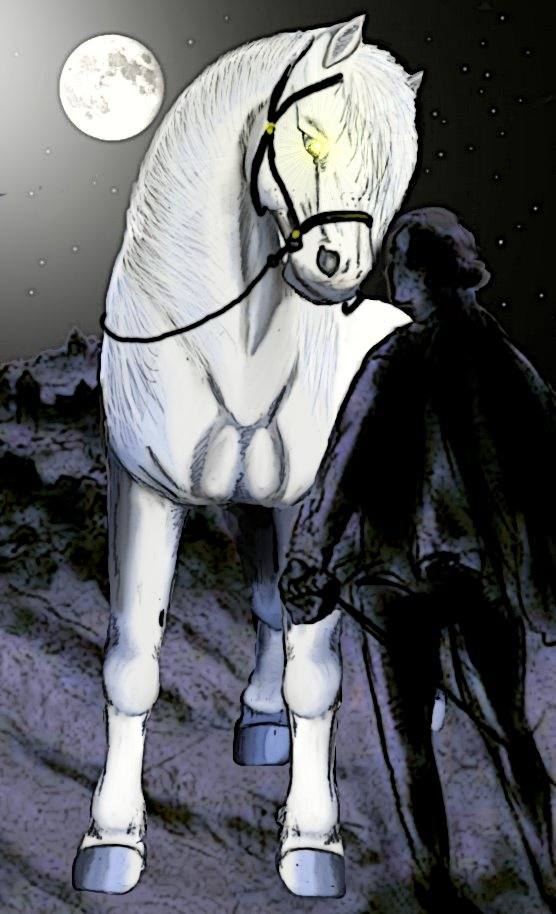

The Cheval Mallet (or Malet, meaning Mallet Horse) describes a fabulous and evil horse mentioned in folklore around the French Vendée, Poitou, and more frequently in the Pays de Retz, near Lac de Grand Lieu. It was supposed to appear at night (sometimes specifically in the middle of the night) as a beautiful white or black horse, saddled and bridled, and tempt travelers who were exhausted from a long journey. Unwary travelers who accepted a ride would never be seen again, unless they had the price of travel or a protection spell, such as a medal of St. Benedict.

There was also a feast known as Horse Merlette, Merlet or Mallet in the town of Saint-Lumine-de-Coutais. It was a celebration of renewal and featured several actors around one oak, one disguised as a horse. It was opposed by the ecclesiastical authorities and banned in 1791.
