= Vanir =

Subgroup of Norse deities

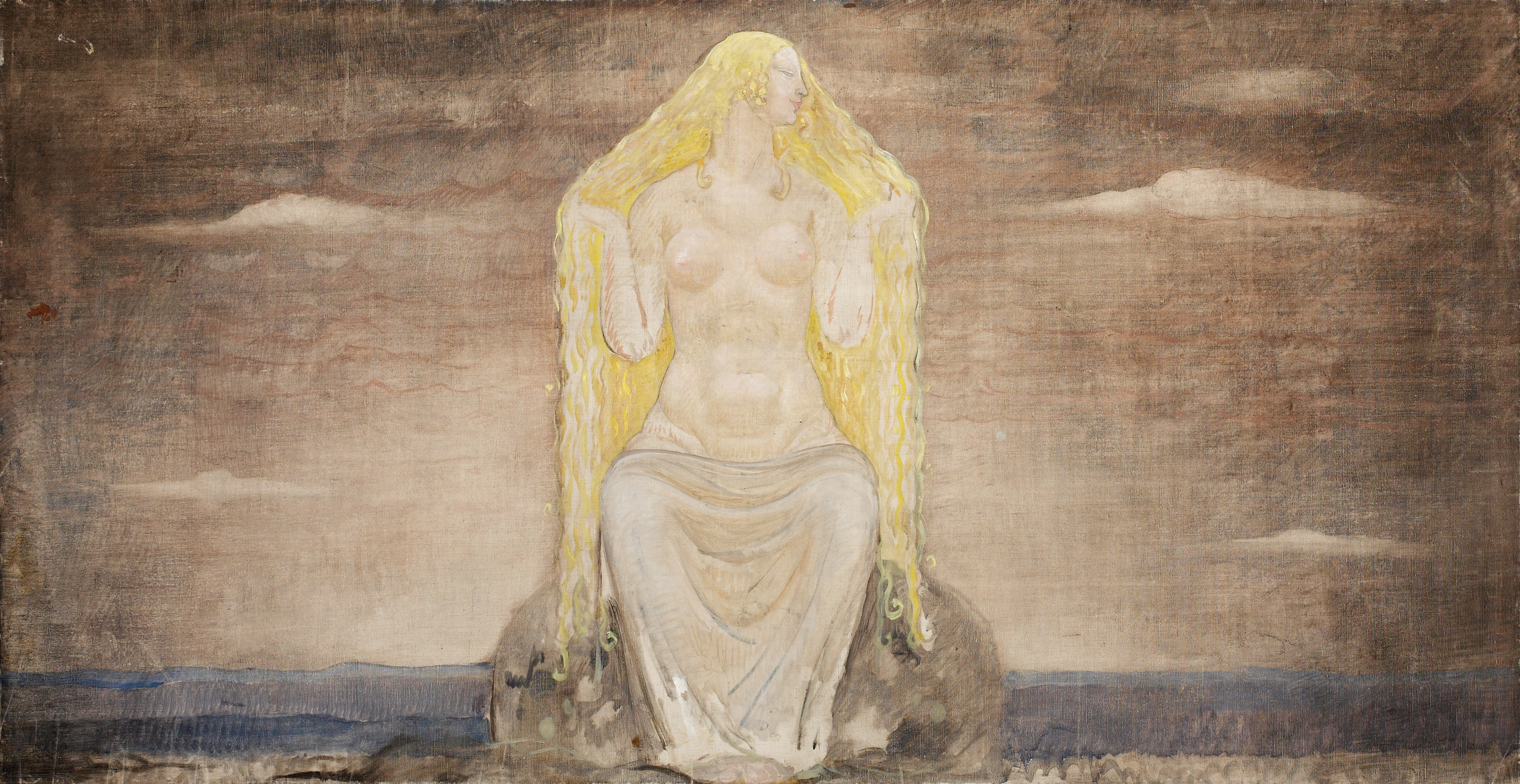
Freyja by John Bauer (1882–1918)

In Norse mythology, the Vanir (/ˈvɑːnɪər/; Old Norse:, singular Vanr) are a group of gods associated with fertility, wisdom, and the ability to see the future. The Vanir are one of two groups of gods (the other being the Æsir) and are the namesake of the location Vanaheimr (Old Norse "Home of the Vanir"). After the Æsir–Vanir War, the Vanir became a subgroup of the Æsir. Subsequently, at least some members of the Vanir are at times also referred to as being Æsir.

The Vanir are attested in the Poetic Edda, compiled in the 13th century from earlier traditional sources; the Prose Edda and Heimskringla, both written in the 13th century by Snorri Sturluson; and in the poetry of skalds. The Vanir are attested only in these Old Norse sources.

All sources describe the god Njörðr, and his children Freyr and Freyja as members of the Vanir. A euhemerized prose account in Heimskringla adds that Njörðr's sister—whose name is not provided—and Kvasir were Vanir. In addition, Heimskringla reports a tale involving king Sveigðir's visit to Vanaheimr, where he meets a woman by the name of Vana and the two produce a child named Vanlandi (whose name means "Man from the Land of the Vanir").

While not attested as Vanir, the gods Heimdall and Ullr have been theorized as potential members of the group. In the Prose Edda, a name listed for boars is "Van-child". Scholars have theorized that the Vanir may be connected to small pieces of gold foil found in Scandinavia at some building sites from the Migration Period to the Viking Age and occasionally in graves. They have speculated whether the Vanir originally represented pre-Indo-European deities or Indo-European fertility gods, and have theorized a form of the gods as venerated by the pagan Anglo-Saxons.

== Etymology ==
Numerous theories have been proposed for the etymology of Vanir. Scholar R. I. Page says that, while there is no shortage of etymologies for the word, it is tempting to link the word with Old Norse vinr ('friend') and Latin Venus ('goddess of physical love'). Vanir is sometimes anglicized to Wanes (singular Wane). (Note: This occurs, for example, in the Henry Adams Bellows translation of the Poetic Edda, cf. Bellows 1923, p. 10.)

== Attestations ==
=== Poetic Edda ===
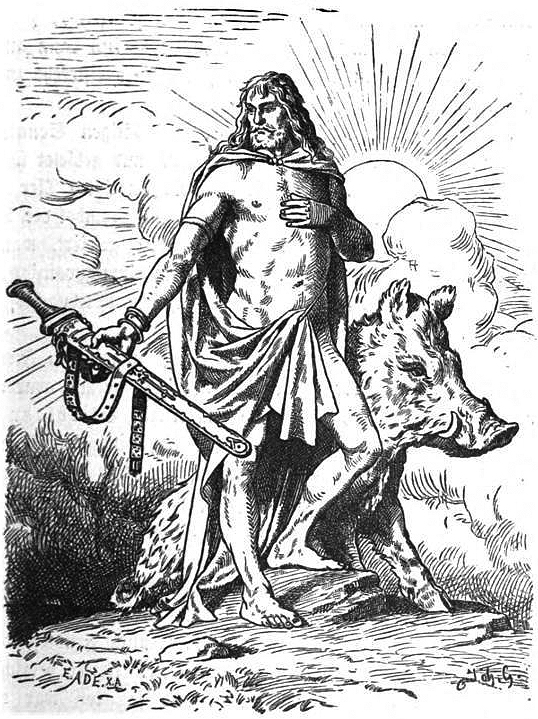
The sun shining behind them, the god Freyr stands with his boar Gullinbursti (1901), by Johannes Gehrts.

In the Poetic Edda, the Vanir, as a group, are specifically referenced in the poems Völuspá, Vafþrúðnismál, Skírnismál, Þrymskviða, Alvíssmál, and Sigrdrífumál. In Völuspá, a stanza describes the events of the Æsir–Vanir War, noting that during the war the Vanir broke the walls of the stronghold of the Æsir, and that the Vanir were "indomitable, trampling the plain".

In Vafþrúðnismál, Gagnráðr (the god Odin in disguise) engages in a game of wits with the jötunn Vafþrúðnir. Gagnráðr asks Vafþrúðnir where the Van god Njörðr came from, for though he rules over many hofs and hörgrs, Njörðr was not raised among the Æsir. Vafþrúðnir responds that Njörðr was created in Vanaheimr ("home of the Vanir") by "wise powers" and details that during the Æsir–Vanir War, Njörðr was exchanged as a hostage. In addition, when the world ends (Ragnarök), Njörðr "will return to the wise Vanir".

Alvíssmál consists of question and answer exchanges between the dwarf Alvíss and the god Thor. In the poem, Alvíss supplies terms that various groups, including the Vanir, use to refer to various subjects. Alvíss attributes nine terms to the Vanir; one for Earth ("The Ways"), Heaven ("The Weaver of Winds"), clouds ("Kites of the Wind"), calm ("The Hush of the Winds"), the sea ("The Wave"), fire ("Wildfire"), wood ("The Wand"), seed ("growth"), and ale ("The Foaming").

The poem Þrymskviða states that the god Heimdallr possesses foreknowledge, "as the Vanir also can". Sigrdrífumál records that the Vanir are in possession of a "sacred mead". In the poem, the valkyrie Sigrdrífa provides mystical lore about runes to the hero Sigurd. Sigrdrífa notes that runes were once carved on to various creatures, deities, and other figures, and then shaved off and mixed with a "sacred mead". This mead is possessed by the Æsir, the elves, mankind, and the Vanir.

In Skírnismál, the beautiful jötunn Gerðr first encounters the god Freyr's messenger Skírnir, and asks him if he is of the elves, of the Æsir, or of the "wise Vanir". Skírnir responds that he is not of any of the three groups. Later in the poem, Skírnir is successful in his threats against Gerðr (to have Gerðr accept Freyr's affections), and Gerðr offers Skírnir a crystal cup full of mead, noting that she never thought that she would love one of the Vanir.

=== Prose Edda ===
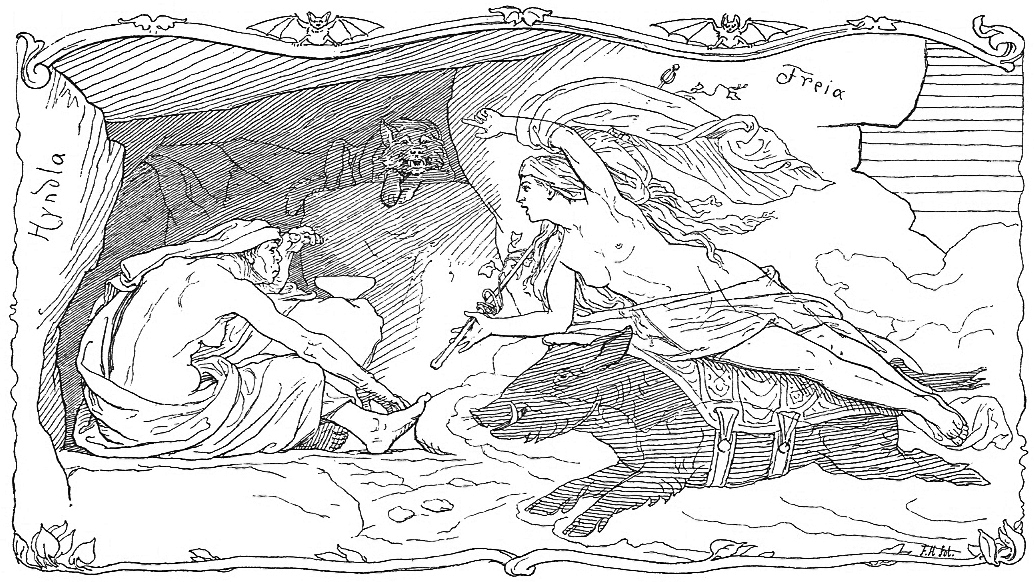
Flanked by her boar Hildisvini, the Vanr goddess Freyja (right) (1895), by Lorenz Frølich

The Vanir are mentioned in the Prose Edda books Gylfaginning and Skáldskaparmál. In chapter 23 of Gylfaginning, the enthroned figure of High relates that Njörðr was raised in Vanaheimr. High says that during the Æsir–Vanir War, the Vanir sent Njörðr as a hostage to the Æsir, and the Æsir sent to the Vanir the god Hœnir. The sending of Njörðr as a hostage resulted in a peace agreement between the Æsir and the Vanir.

Chapter 35 provides information regarding the goddess Freyja, including that one of her names is "Dís of the Vanir". In the same chapter, High tells that the goddess Gná rides the horse Hófvarpnir, and that this horse has the ability to ride through the air and atop the sea. High continues that "once some Vanir saw her path as she rode through the air" and that an unnamed one of these Vanir says, in verse (for which no source is provided):

"What flies there?
What fares there?
or moves through the air?"

Gná responds:

"I fly not
though I fare
and move through the air
on Hofvarpnir
the one whom Hamskerpir got
with Gardrofa."

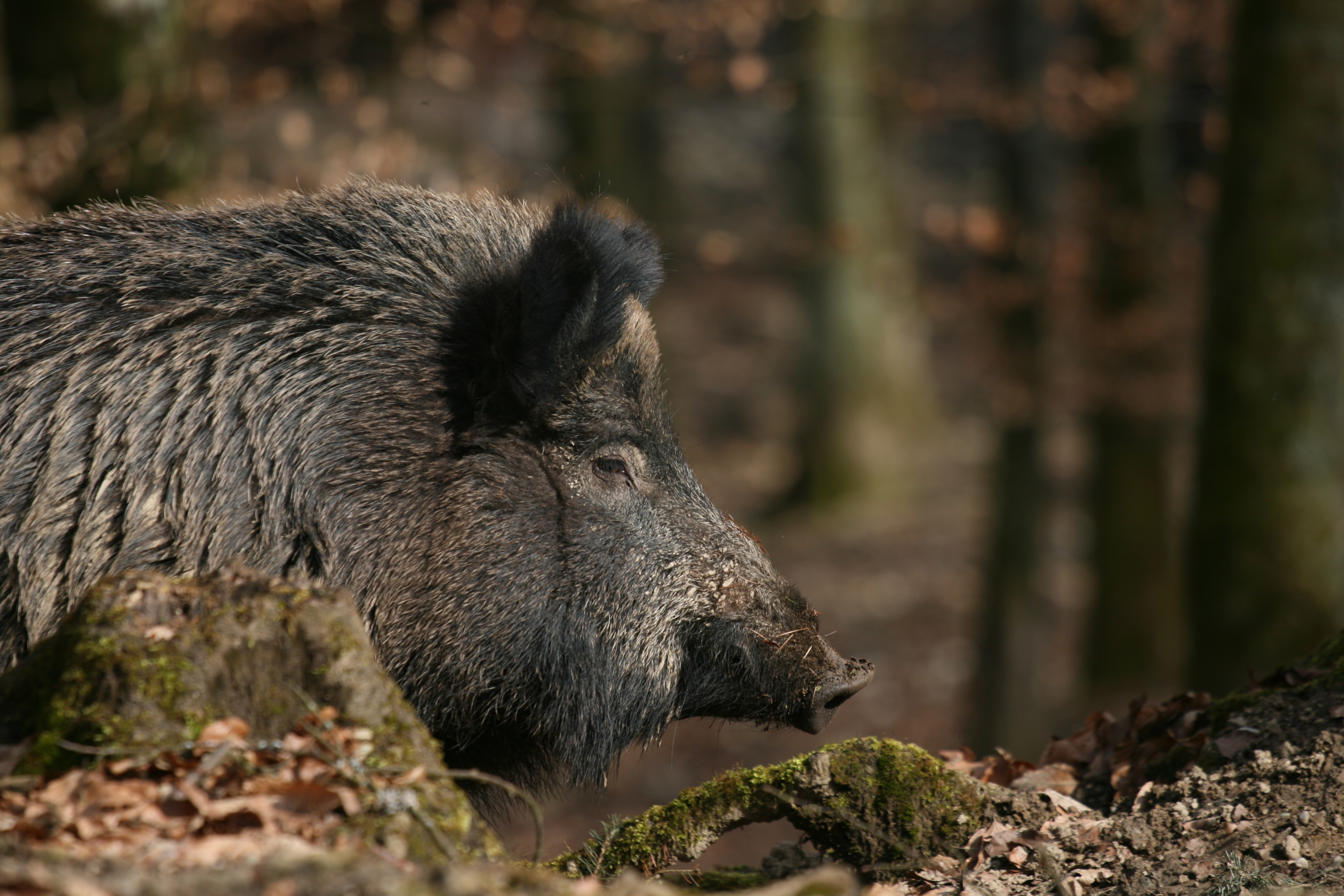
A wild boar in Northern Europe. In the Prose Edda, "Van-child" is listed as a name for boars. Both Freyja and Freyr are attested as accompanied by boars.

In chapter 57 of Skáldskaparmál, the god Bragi explains the origin of poetry. Bragi says the origin of poetry lies in the Æsir–Vanir War. During the peace conference held to end the war both the Æsir and the Vanir formed a truce by spitting into a vat. When they left, the gods decided that it should not be poured out, but rather kept as a symbol of their peace, and so from the contents they made a man; Kvasir. Kvasir is later murdered by dwarves, and from his blood the Mead of Poetry is made.

In chapter 6, poetic names for Njörðr are provided, including "descendant of Vanir or a Van". As reference, a poem by the 11th century skald Þórðr Sjáreksson is provided where Njörðr is described as a Vanr. In chapter 7, poetic names for Freyr are listed, including names that reference his association with the Vanir; "Vanir god", "descendant of Vanir", and "a Van". Freyja is also repeatedly cited as a Vanr. In chapter 20, some of Freyja's names are listed and include "Van-deity" and "Van-lady", and chapter 37 provides skaldic verse referring to Freyja as "Van-bride". In chapter 75, names for pigs are provided, including "Van-child", a name shared with Freyr.

=== Heimskringla ===
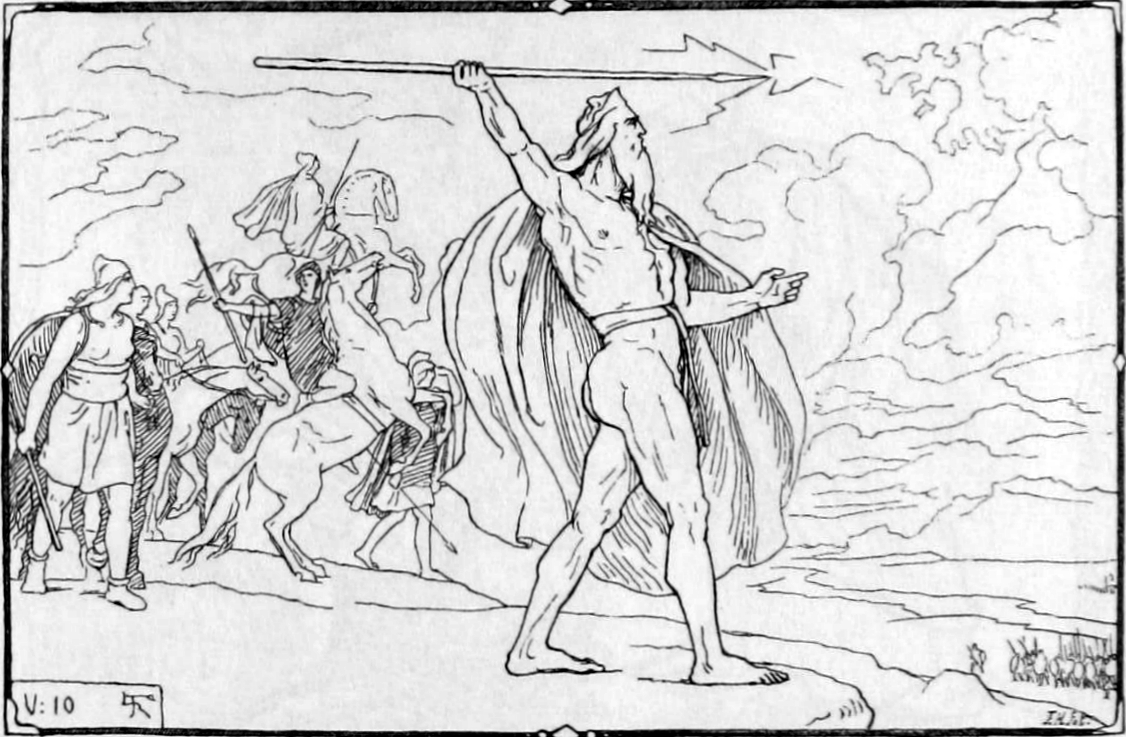
Odin throws his spear at the Vanir host, illustration (1895) by Lorenz Frølich.

The Heimskringla book Ynglinga saga (chapter 4) provides an euhemerized account of the Æsir–Vanir War. As a peace agreement, the two sides agreed to trade hostages. The Vanir sent Njörðr and Freyr to the Æsir, and in turn the Æsir sent Hœnir and Mímir to the Vanir.

Upon receiving Mímir, the Vanir sent the "cleverest amongst them", Kvasir. In Vanaheimr, the Vanir made Hœnir a chieftain. However, whenever Hœnir appeared at assemblies or meetings where the Vanir asked him his opinion on difficult issues, his response was "let others decide". The Vanir suspected that they had been cheated by the Æsir in the hostage exchange, and so grabbed hold of Mímir, cut off Mímir's head, and sent it to the Æsir.

The same chapter describes that while Njörðr lived among the Vanir, his wife (unnamed) was his sister, and the couple had two children: Freyr and Freyja. However, "among the Æsir it was forbidden to marry so near a kin". By Odin's appointment, Njörðr and his son Freyr became priests over offerings of sacrifice, and they were recognized as gods among the Æsir. Freyja was priestess at the sacrifices, and "it was she who first taught the Æsir magic as was practiced among the Vanir".

In chapter 15, the king Sveigðir is recorded as having married a woman named Vana in "Vanaland", located in Sweden. The two produced a child, who they named Vanlandi (Old Norse "Man from the Land of the Vanir".

== Archaeological record ==
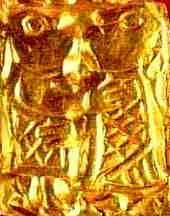
A leafy bough between them, two figures embrace on a small piece of gold foil dating from the Migration Period to the early Viking Age.

Small pieces of gold foil decorated with pictures of figures dating from the Migration Period into the early Viking Age (known as gullgubber) have been discovered in various locations in Scandinavia, in one case almost 2,500. The foil pieces have been found largely at sites of buildings, only rarely in graves.

The figures are sometimes single, occasionally an animal, sometimes a man and a woman with a leafy bough between them, facing or embracing one another. The human figures are almost always clothed and are sometimes depicted with their knees bent. Scholar Hilda Ellis Davidson says that it has been suggested that the figures are partaking in a dance, and that they may have been connected with weddings and linked to the Vanir, representing the notion of a divine marriage, such as in the Poetic Edda poem Skírnismál; the coming together of the Vanir god Freyr and his love, Gerðr.

== Scholarly reception ==
=== Historicists and structuralists ===
Much of the discussion among scholars on the topic of the Vanir has historically been on the question of whether the Vanir are the reflection of a purported historic meeting between different peoples in the ancient past (historicists) or an extension of Proto-Indo-European mythology where such a narrative may have existed for complex social reasons (structuralists) among the early Indo-European peoples, and thereafter spread to their descendants. Notable proponents of the historicist position include Karl Helm, Ernst Alfred Philippson, Lotte Motz, and Lotte Headegger, whereas notable proponents of the structuralist view include Georges Dumézil, Jan de Vries, and Gabriel Turville-Petre. The structuralist view has generally gained the most support among academics, although with caveats, including among Jens Peter Schjødt, Margaret Clunies Ross, and Thomas DuBois. (Note: For additional discussion on this topic, see Dumézil 1959, Dumézil 1973, and Tolley 2011, p. 22.)

Like the Vanr goddess Freyja, the Vanir as a group are not attested outside Scandinavia. Traditionally, following Völuspá and the Prose Edda, scholarship on the Vanir has focused on the Æsir–Vanir War, its possible basis in a war between peoples, and whether the Vanir originated as the deities of a distinct people. Some scholars have doubted that they were known outside Scandinavia; however, there is evidence that the god Freyr is the same god as the Germanic deity Ing (reconstructed as Proto-Germanic *Ingwaz), and that, if so, he is attested as having been known among the Goths.

=== Membership, elves, ship symbolism, "field of the dead", and vanitates ===
Hilda Ellis Davidson theorizes that all of the wives of the gods may have originally been members of the Vanir, noting that many of them appear to have originally been children of jötnar. Davidson additionally notes that "it is the Vanir and Odin who seem to receive the most hostile treatment in Christian stories about mythological personages".

Joseph S. Hopkins and Haukur Þorgeirsson, building on suggestions by archaeologist Ole Crumlin-Pedersen and others, link the Vanir to ship burial customs among the North Germanic peoples, proposing an early Germanic model of a ship in a "field of the dead" that may be represented both by Freyja's afterlife field Fólkvangr and by the Old English Neorxnawang (the mysterious first element of which may be linked to the name of Freyja's father, Njörðr).

Richard North theorizes that glossing Latin vanitates ("vanities", "idols") for "gods" in Old English sources implies the existence of *uuani (a reconstructed cognate to Old Norse Vanir) in Deiran dialect and hence that the gods that Edwin of Northumbria and the northern Angles worshiped in pre-Christian Anglo-Saxon England were likely to have been the *uuani. He comments that they likely "shared not only the name but also the orgiastic character of the [Old Icelandic] Vanir".

Alaric Hall has equated the Vanir with the elves.

=== Rudolf Simek's "Vanir Obituary" ===
In a 2010 piece building on an earlier proposal by Lotte Motz, Rudolf Simek argues that vanir was originally nothing more than a general term for deities like æsir, and that its employment as a name for a distinct group of deities was an invention of Snorri, whom he identifies as the author of the Prose Edda. According to Simek, the Vanir are therefore "a figment of imagination from the 13th to 20th centuries". Simek states that he "believe[s] that these are not mistakes that we are dealing with here, but a deliberate invention on the part of Snorri".

Simek's argument receive some level of support from Frog and Jonathan Roper (2011), who analyze the small corpus of poetic usages of Vanir. The authors suggest that this implies that vanir was a "suspended archaism" used as a metrical alternative to Æsir but with the caveat that "These observations should not, however, be considered to present a solution to the riddle of vanir". In a collection of papers in honor of Simek, Frog (2021) states support for Simek's proposal.

However, Simek's proposal has been rejected by several scholars, including Clive Tolley, Leszek P. Słupecki, Jens Peter Schjødt, and Terry Gunnell. Tolley argues that the term must have originated in historical usage, and that "it is something of a misrepresentation of the evidence to suggest that Snorri is the main source for the vanir". Tolley continues:

"the evidence affords opportunity to interpret the vanir as a class of beings with a cohesive functionality, as I have attempted to show. In turn, since this functionality can be shown to mirror concerns with a widespread occurrence within comparative religious studies, there is good reason for maintaining the importance of the vanir as a discrete group of divine beings. I would even venture to suggest that—far from being minor characters in the Norse pantheon, as Simek and others believe—the vanir are likely to have been involved in the most intimate and central aspects of human existence, as my analysis of their functions shows.
It may well be for this very reason that Christian missionaries such as St. Óláfr were intent upon their eradication, leaving us so little information. If, as Vǫluspá intimates, the vanir were particularly the "sweet scent", the darlings, of women, there may have been even greater incentive for the new muscular and masculine Christianity to ensure their demise, as a cult fostered by the guardians of the home would be a serious threat to the spread of the new religion."

Słupecki argues that the Vanir remained distinct from the Æsir – except for Freyja and Freyr, whom he follows the Prose Edda in seeing as having been born after Njörðr became a hostage among the Æsir, and thus regards as Æsir – and therefore that Ragnarök "[has] no importance for their world".

According to Jens Peter Schjødt,

"even if the term Vanir were not in existence in pagan times, it does not change substantially the fact that in pre-Christian Scandinavian mythology we deal with two groups of gods who sometimes overlap, whereas at other times they are clearly distinguished, just as to be expected in an anthropomorphic mythology. It would be wrong to look for coherence in any mythology. As I have considered in more detail elsewhere, what we can realistically hope to reconstruct is not a coherent mythological or theological system, as this seems to be more of an ideal dream among scholars who are strongly influenced by an older sort of theology, but rather a set of variants that may be part of a deep structure, although with internal contradictions among the various myth-complexes and various 'loose ends'. In the real world, among real people, such coherence is, as a general rule, absent."

Schjødt, in response to Simek's piece, says:

"the conclusion, in relation to Simek's article would be, then, that even if he should be right about the Vanir, we would still be better off if we had a designation for the gods we have traditionally seen as belonging to the Vanir group. And perhaps Vanir, then, in spite of all the uncertainties that accrue to it, would still be the most convenient term."

Terry Gunnell proposes that the Vanir's

"recurring patterns in the narratives nonetheless imply that in the oral traditions of Norway and Iceland, people seem to have viewed the religious activities connected with the 'Vanir' (with their center in Sweden) as having been different in nature to those encountered elsewhere. They also seem to have been envisioned closer connections between the Vanir and the landscape than existed between the Æsir and the natural environment."

Gunnell concludes that

"this evidence lends weight to the argument that, in spite of recent arguments to the contrary, the religion associated with the Vanir and Æsir gods had a different nature and origin."

== Modern influence ==
The Vanir are featured in the poem "Om vanerne" by Oehlenschläger (1819). (Note: Oehlenschläger, A.G. (1819). "Om vanerne". Nordens Guder; cited by Simek 2007, p. 352.) Some Germanic Neopagans refer to their beliefs as Vanatrú (meaning "those who honor the Vanir").

== See also ==
- Common Germanic deities
- List of Germanic deities
- Titan (mythology)

== Bibliography ==
- Bellows, Henry Adams (Trans.) (1923). The Poetic Edda. New York: The American-Scandinavian Foundation.
- Byock, Jesse (Trans.) (2005). The Prose Edda. Penguin Classics. ISBN 0-14-044755-5.
- Davidson, H. R. Ellis (1969). Scandinavian Mythology. Paul Hamlyn.
- Davidson, Hilda Roderick Ellis (1988). Myths and Symbols in Pagan Europe: Early Scandinavian and Celtic Religions. Manchester University Press. ISBN 0-7190-2579-6.
- Dumézil, Georges (1959). "Dieux Ases et dieux Vanes". Les Dieux des germains: essai sur la formation de la religion scandinave. Mythes et religions (in French). Vol. 39 (rev. ed.). Paris: Presses universitaires de France. pp. 3–39. OCLC 1719020.
- Dumézil, Georges (1973). "The gods: Aesir and Vanir". In Einar Haugen (ed.). Gods of the Ancient Northmen. Publications of the UCLA Center for the Study of Comparative Folklore and Mythology. Vol. 3. Translated by John Lindow. Berkeley: University of California Press. pp. 3–25. ISBN 978-0520020443.
- Faulkes, Anthony (Trans.) (1995). Edda. Everyman. ISBN 0-460-87616-3..
- Frog & Roper, Jonathan (2011). "Versus versus the 'Vanir': Response to Simek's "Vanir Obituary"" (PDF). RMN Newsletter (2). The University of Helsinki: 29–37. Archived (PDF) from the original on 23 March 2022. ISSN-L: 1799–4497.
- Frog (2021). "The Æsir: An Obituary". In Sabine Heidi Walther; Regina Jucknies; Judith Meurer-Bongardt; Jens Eike Schnall (eds.). In Res, artes et religio: Essays in Honour of Rudolf Simek. Leeds: Kismet Press. pp. 141–175.
- Grundy, Stephan (1998). "Freyja and Frigg". In Billington, Sandra & Green, Miranda (eds.). The Concept of the Goddess. Routledge. ISBN 0-415-19789-9..
- Gunnell, Terry (2018). Pernille Hermann; Stephen A. Mitchell; Jens Peter Schjødt; Amber J. Rose (eds.). "Blótgyðjur, Goðar, Mimi, Incest, and Wagons: Oral Memories of the Vanir". Old Norse Mythology—Comparative Perspectives. Ed. Pernille Hermann, Stephen A. Mitchell, and Jens Peter Schjødt, with Amber J. Rose. Old Norse Mythology – Comparative Perspectives. Harvard University: 113–137.
- Hall, Alaric (2007). Elves in Anglo-Saxon England: Matters of Belief, Health, Gender and Identity. Anglo-Saxon Studies. Vol. 8. Woodbridge, Suffolk / Rochester, New York: Boydell Press. ISBN 978-1843832942.
- Harvey, Graham (2000). Contemporary Paganism: Listening People, Speaking Earth. NYU Press. ISBN 0-8147-3620-3.
- Hopkins, Joseph S. & Haukur, Þorgeirsson (2011). "The Ship in the Field" (PDF). RMN Newsletter (3). The University of Helsinki: 14–18. Archived (PDF) from the original on 4 March 2016. ISSN-L: 1799–4497.
- Hollander, Lee Milton (Trans.) (2007). Heimskringla: History of the Kings of Norway. University of Texas Press. ISBN 978-0-292-73061-8. Archived from the original on 23 April 2023.
- Larrington, Carolyne (Trans.) (1999). The Poetic Edda. Oxford World's Classics. Oxford. ISBN 0-19-283946-2..
- McKinnell, John (2005). Meeting the Other in Norse Myth and Legend. DS Brewer. ISBN 1-84384-042-1.
- North, Richard (1998). Heathen Gods in Old English Literature. Cambridge University Press. ISBN 0-521-55183-8.
- Page, R. I. (1990). Norse Myths. University of Texas Press. ISBN 0-292-75546-5.
- Schjødt, Jens Peter (2014). "New Perspectives on the Vanir Gods in Pre-Christian Scandinavian Mythology and Religion". In Timothy R. Tangherlini (ed.). Nordic Mythologies: Interpretations, Intersections, and Institutions. pp. 19–34.
- Simek, Rudolf (1993). Dictionary of Northern Mythology. Cambridge [England]: D.S. Brewer. ISBN 9780859915137.
- Simek, Rudolf (2007). Dictionary of Northern Mythology. Translated by Angela Hall. D.S. Brewer. ISBN 978-0-85991-513-7.
- Simek, Rudolf (2010). "The Vanir: An Obituary" (PDF). RMN Newsletter (1). The University of Helsinki: 10–19. Archived (PDF) from the original on 15 August 2015. ISSN-L: 1799–4497.
- Słupecki, Leszek P. (2011). "The Vanir and ragnarǫk" (PDF). RMN Newsletter (3). The University of Helsinki: 11–13. Archived (PDF) from the original on 4 March 2016. ISSN-L: 1799–4497.
- Tolley, Clive (2011). "In Defence of the Vanir" (PDF). RMN Newsletter (2). The University of Helsinki: 20–37. Archived (PDF) from the original on 24 September 2015. ISSN-L: 1799–4497.
