= Hamskerpir and Garðrofa =

Characters in Norse mythology

In Norse mythology, Hamskerpir and Garðrofa are a pair of horses who sired Hófvarpnir, the horse ridden by the goddess Gná. Hamskerpir and Garðrofa are attested in the Prose Edda, written in the 13th century by Snorri Sturluson.

== Attestations ==
In chapter 35 of the Prose Edda book Gylfaginning, High provides brief descriptions of 16 ásynjur. High lists Gná thirteenth, and in his description provides a stanza that gives Gná's horse Hófvarpnir's parents as Hamskerðir and Garðrofa:

"I fly not
though I fare
and move through the air
on Hofvarpnir
the one whom Hamskerpir got
with Gardrofa."

== Theories ==
John Lindow says that the name Hamskerpir does not have an obvious meaning, but that Garðrofa may mean "fence breaker." Lindow adds that two horses are otherwise unknown from any other source, and that the myths surrounding them have not survived.

== See also ==
- Horses in Germanic paganism
- List of horses in mythology and folklore
