= Pheme =

Greco-Roman goddess of fame

- Personification of Fame
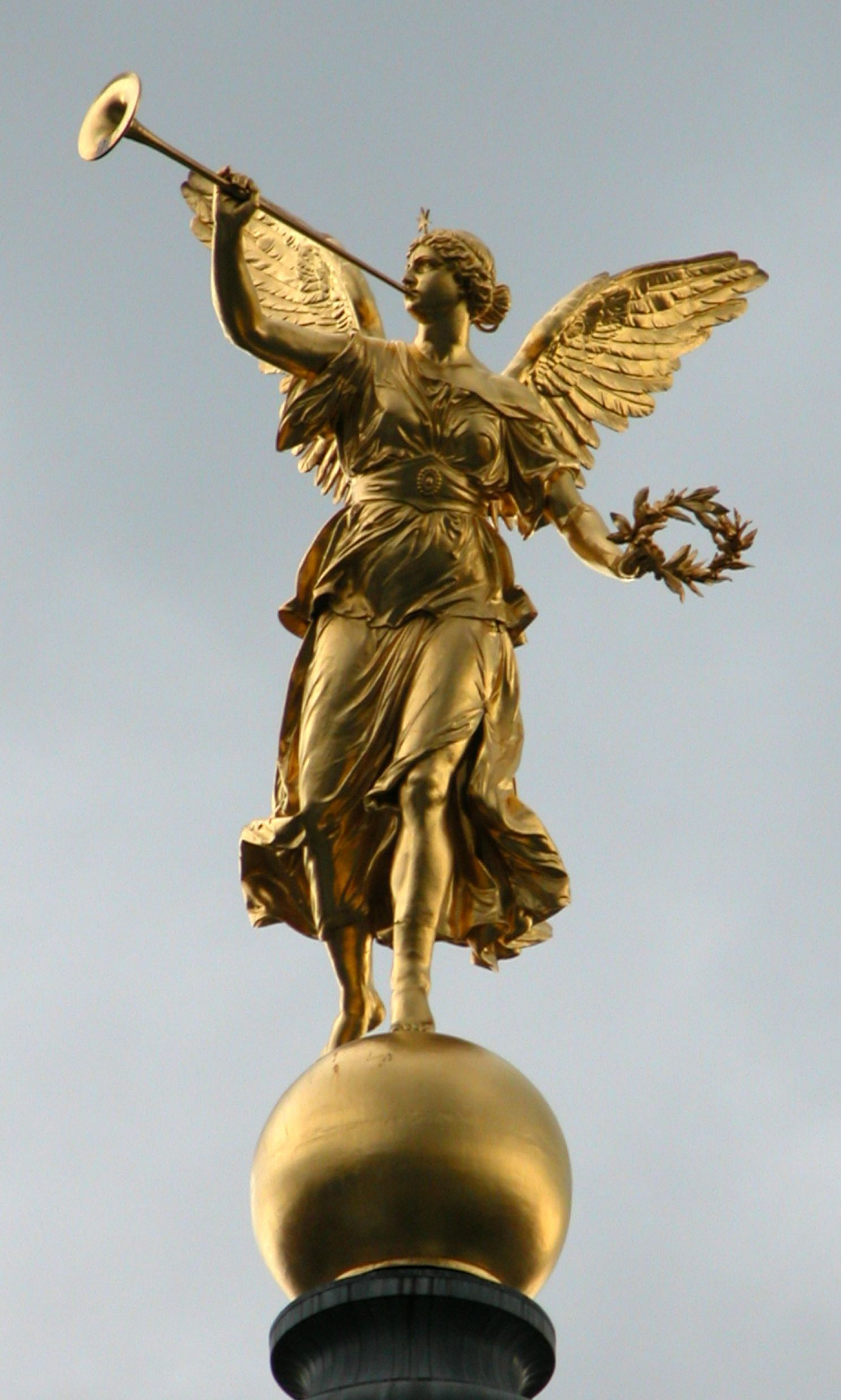
- Sculpture of Fama with a trumpet and wings on the dome of the Dresden Academy of Fine Arts
- Major cult center: Athens
- Symbol: Trumpet
- Gender: Female

Equivalents
- Roman: Fama

In Greek mythology, Pheme (/ˈfiːmiː/ FEE-mee; Greek: Φήμη, Phēmē), also known as Ossa ("Rumor") in Homeric literature, was the divine personification of fame, renown, and rumors. Her equivalent in Roman mythology, Fama, was likewise the personification of fame, and was depicted similarly in Roman literature and art. Both goddesses represented the two-sided nature of fame; those in their favor received notability and praise, while those subject to their wrath were haunted by scandal and rumors.

== Etymology ==
The Greek word pheme is related to Φάναι "to speak" and can mean "fame," "report," or "rumor." The Latin word fama, with the same range of meanings, is related to the Latin fari ("to speak"), and is, through French, the etymon of the English "fame."

== Pheme in ancient Greece ==
As an allegorical deity, Pheme did not have associated mythology nor a place in the pantheon. While there is no surviving ancient art depicting her, she has appeared as a figure in ancient literature. The orator Aeschines discussed her role as a goddess in his speech Against Timarchus, where he described her as being able to reveal a man's true character, whether they be dead or alive. Additionally, as he did not have concrete proof of his defamatory accusations against Timarchus, Aeschines symbolically called upon Pheme to be his witness. Hesiod discussed Pheme in a more negative light in his Works and Days— describing her as a mischievous figure whose gossip never truly dies away.

Sophocles described Pheme as a daughter of Elpis: a minor goddess of hope. Some scholars have proposed a potential connection between Pheme and Hermes, as they both acted as messenger gods.

=== Worship in Athens ===
Pheme was worshipped in Athens, although scholars do not know to what extent. An altar to the goddess was established in the agora as early as the 5th century BCE, and remained active until the imperial era. It may have been dedicated to commemorate the news of a victory of Cimon's over the Persians in Pamphylia. The news of the victory travelled extremely quickly— as if by divine intervention— and this was attributed to the goddess. Alternately, Procopius of Gaza claimed the altar was erected to celebrate the Greek victory in the Battle of Mykale in 479 BCE.

=== In the Homeric epics ===
In the Odyssey and Iliad, a divine personification of ossia ("rumor") appears. In the Iliad, Ossia acted as a messenger of Zeus, urging men to receive take up arms at the behest of Agamemnon and Nestor. In the Odyssey, Ossia again acted as a messenger; she travelled through the city spreading the news of Odysseus' massacre of Penelope's suitors.

== Fama in ancient Rome ==
In Roman mythology, Fama was the personification of fame and renown, and was often pictured with wings and a trumpet. Like Pheme, she was not the subject of a cult, and did not have associated mythology.

=== In the Aeneid ===
In Book 4 of the Aeneid, Virgil describes Fama as a monstrous creature and a "great ill" who appears to spread news of Dido and Aeneas' relationship. She is a Titan and daughter of Gaia, borne as an act of revenge against the Olympians. She moves across the earth— so tall that her head is hidden by the clouds— with wings and a massive body covered in feathers, eyes, ears, and mouths. She never sleeps, and perpetually spreads news and rumors, with her favorite thing to spread being news of current or future misfortunes.

While Virgil was undoubtedly influenced by Homer and Hesiod's depictions of the goddess, this version of Fama was largely his own creation. Interestingly, while his version of Fama is a fairly malicious force, she does not spread lies about Dido and Aeneas' relationship.

=== In the Metamorphoses ===
In Ovid's Metamorphoses, less attention is given to Fama herself; instead, her home is the focus, and her physical form is not described. She resides where the land, sea, and heavens meet, hearing and seeing all. Her house is made of brass, the walls of which capture and echo rumors, both true and false. There are thousands of windows, no gates or doors, and a tower where the goddess can sit and overlook the earth. The building is never silent; it is occupied by roaming crowds of rumors that come and go, warping and spreading what they hear.

=== In the Thebaid ===
Fama is referenced multiple times in Statius' epic poem Thebaid, which recounts brothers Eteocles and Polynices' conflict over the throne of Thebes. In the text, Fama is a messenger, but only appears to spread rumor between cities; she does not involve herself in local or low-stakes rumors and gossip. When Adrastus, king of Argos, pledges to marry off his daughters, Fama is described as a troublesome force, further inflaming relations between Argos and Thebes:

"Rumor [Fama] goes through allied cities, and is busy far in the neighboring countryside... nor less does the same troubler goddess leap upon Ogygian Thebes. With all her wings she overspreads the city and affrights the Labdacian ruler with echoes of the night just passed: she chants of guests and weddings, pacts of royalty and mingling of families, and now (such license has the monster, such her madness!) of war."

— Statius, Thebaid, 2.201–13

Later, Fama and Mars work together to inspire the Argives to take up arms, and once they are successful, she appears to spread news of the Argive forces preparing to lay siege to Thebes. In Thebes, she spreads rumors of cavalries on the shores of Asopus, of Bacchanals in the forests around the city, of Dirce soaked in blood, the return of the Sphinx, and other outrageous and terrifying untruths. Statius describes her as moving faster and more nimbly when bringing painful news.

== English modern theatre ==
In English Renaissance theatre, Rumour was a stock personification, best known from William Shakespeare's Henry IV, Part 2 in the quote "Open your ears; for which of you will stop The vent of hearing, when loud Rumour speaks?". James C. Bulman's Arden Shakespeare edition notes numerous lesser known theatrical examples.

== See also ==
- Polychronion
- Iris
- Gná
