= Winged horse =

Mythical horse-like creature with wings

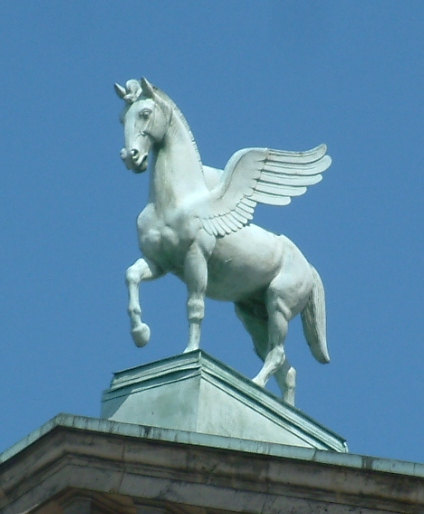
Pegasus, as the winged horse of Muses, on the roof of Poznań Opera House (Max Littmann, 1910)

A winged horse, flying horse, or pterippus is a kind of mythical creature, mostly depicted as a horse with the wings of a bird. Winged horses appear in the mythologies of various cultures including, but not limited to, Greek mythology, Chinese mythology, and Hindu mythology. Multiple types and variations of mythological horses exist across cultures, however, of those that can fly, many possess winged features, avian or otherwise.

== European mythos ==
=== Greco-Roman ===
The Greek winged horse, Pegasus, was sired by Poseidon or, in Roman myth, by Neptune, from Medusa. Often portrayed as a white horse with feathered white wings, he was the steed of the Greek hero Bellerophon until they both met their demise at the hands of Zeus. He also has a constellation, and is often considered the prototypical model for Western winged horses in both ancient and modern depictions.

Additionally, Selene, Greek goddess of the Moon, was often depicted as riding across the night sky either "in a chariot pulled by winged white horses" or on horseback herself. Her brother, Helios, Greek God of the Sun, was also pictured as riding through the sky "on horse-drawn carriage", and though his were not as often depicted as winged, there does exist material of them with wings as well.

=== Horses in the Jura ===
The Jura Mountains on the Alps-Swiss border are mythologized to home magical horses, multiple of which are winged. The White Horse of Foncine was seen often throughout the commune of Foncine-le-Haut, Foncine-le-Bas, and Les Planches, mainly in the dusk. The Horses of Cosges were known to be twin, headless horses with wings that lived in the Canton of Bletterans. Finally, the Sylph Horseman of Bonlieu was said to be the spirit of an old King rode who could be seen riding a winged horse in the Haut-Jura region.

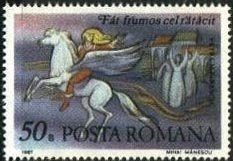
Fǎt-Frumos riding calul năzdrăvan on a 1987 postage stamp

=== Norse ===
While many horses in Norse mythology can fly, only Hófvarpnir, steed of Gná, has been depicted as winged. Sleipnir, Odin's eight-legged horse, is famously capable of flight, but is not said to have had wings.

=== Romanian ===
In the folklore of Romania, the prince and hero Făt-Frumos rides a steed called calul năzdrăvan (loosely translated as 'magic horse'), often depicted as a flying, winged horse who advises the prince in their many adventures.

== East Asian ==
=== Chinese mythology ===
Three winged horses were discussed in ancient Chinese texts, yet the lines between the three seem to blur. Some scholars debate about the distinction or difference between the three, as their features were largely similar.

The tianma (meaning 'heavenly horse') were "blood-sweating horses" sometimes depicted as winged, that were highly sought after by Han Dynasty Emperor Wu.

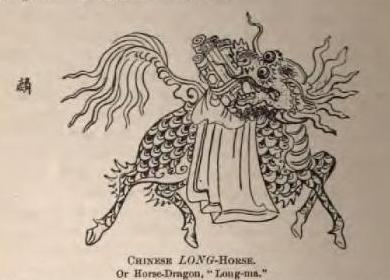
The Longma

Qianlima (meaning 'thousand-li horse'), also called chollima in Korean or senrima in Japanese, was originally written about in Chinese classics and described as a winged horse who could travel hundreds of li (nearly 400 km) in a day.

Finally, the longma (meaning 'dragon horse') was a winged dragon horse referred to in the Bamboo Annals and magic squares arrangements. Although similar to a chimera, longma were often depicted as dragon-horse hybrids with colorful scales who walked on water and were omens of a good emperor to come.

=== Tibetan mythology ===
Lungta, or Wind Horse, in Tibetan Buddhism, is a flying horse, often winged, that was said to carry prayers from humans to the heavens. The horse is known to have a large, colorful gem on its back and is depicted with the four other mythical creatures (dragon, garuda, snow lion, and tiger) on prayer flags. As a symbol, the horse represents the buoyancy of life and fundamental goodness of the human spirit.

== Central Asian ==
=== Turkic mythology ===
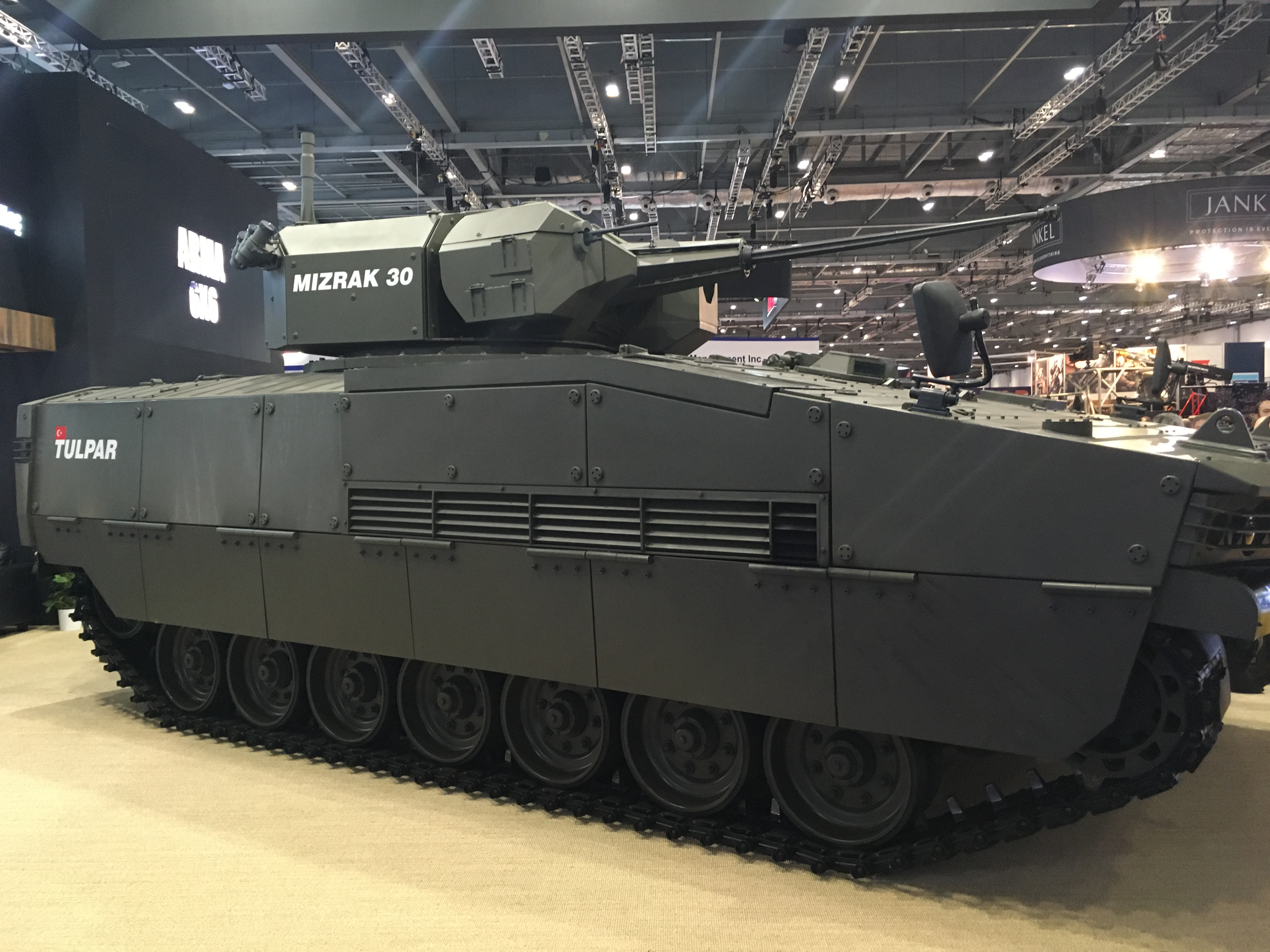
Otokar Tulpar, named after Tulpar in the Turkic mythology

Tulpar is a legendary winged or celestial horse in Turkic mythology. The origins of Tulpar are intertwined with the hunting traditions of Central Asian peoples, who used horses and falconry birds. Over time, these two animals merged in the human imagination, creating the winged horse known as Tulpar.

== Hinduism ==
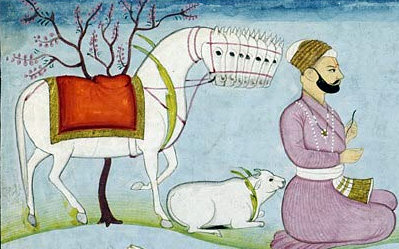
Uchchaisravas, depicted here with seven heads and green wings

Two major winged horses are featured in Hinduism.

In Vishnu's final avatar, Kalki, or Kalkin, is depicted as coming down from the heavens to end the world on a large winged horse named Devadatta (not to be confused with the monk, Devadatta, brother of Siddartha).

Uchchaihshravas, meaning 'Long-Ears', is a seven-headed, winged horse deemed 'King of Horses'. During the original churning of the Sea of Milk, Uchchaihshravas emerged and was grabbed and ridden by Lord Indra.

== Middle Eastern mythos ==
=== Islam ===
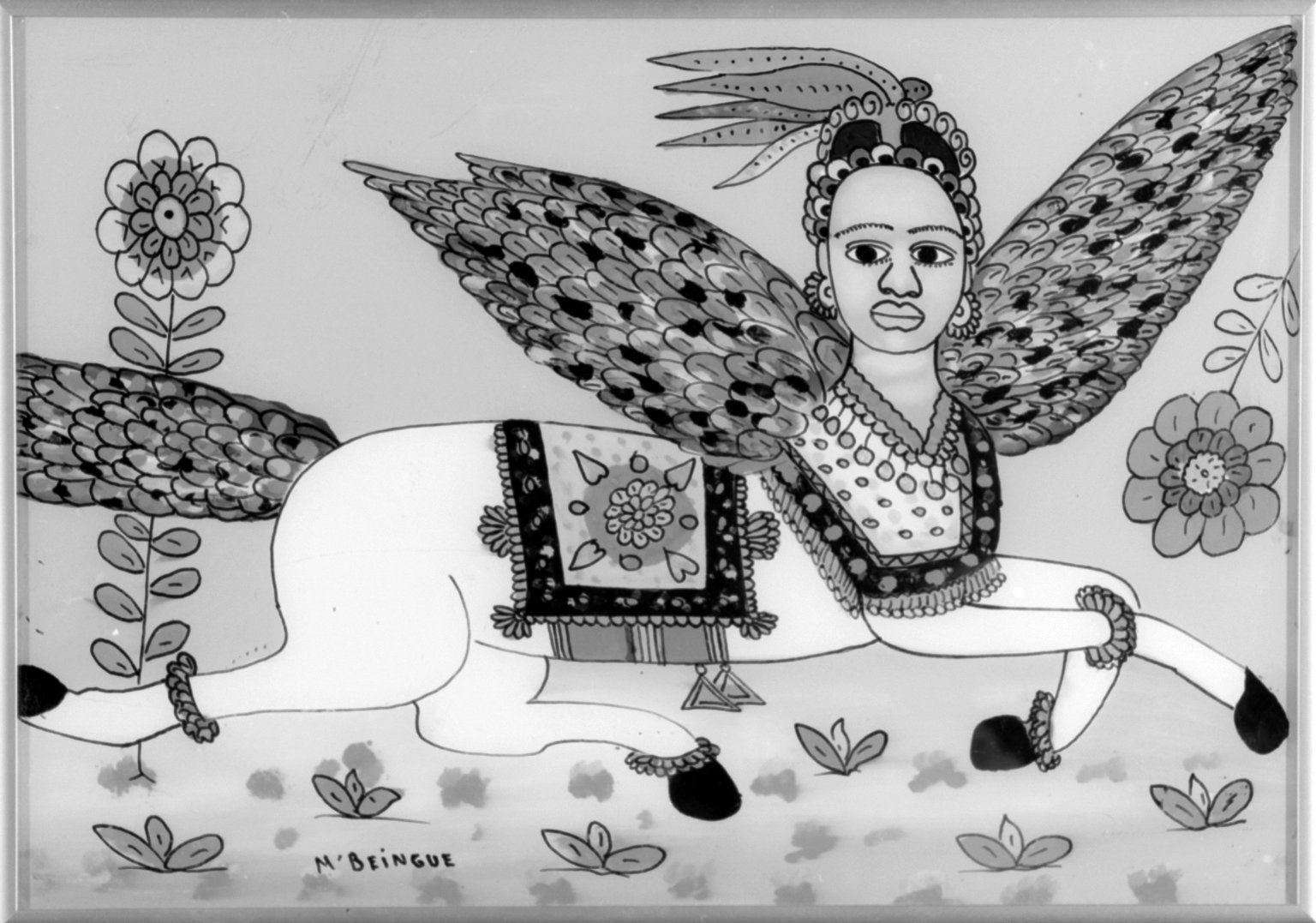
Senegalese depiction of the Al-Buraq

In Islamic tradition, the prophet Muhammad was said to have ridden the Buraq, or Al-Buraq, from Jerusalem, to the Heavens, back to Mecca in one night. While Buraq now constitutes or is said to appear as a flash of lightning, the earliest biographies of Muhammad describe the steed as a white half-donkey, half-mule with large wings and the face of a human.

=== Iran ===
In the Sasanid period and under Zoroastrian tradition, winged horses were understood as carrying souls and as manifestations of the gods Tishtar and Bahram. They were often depicted with one leg raised and on the backs of coins and priestly seals.

== African mythos ==
The Pegasos Aithiopikos, or Ethiopian Pegasus, was born on the shores of the Red Sea near Eritrea. It was said to be directly descended from or inspired by the Greek Pegasus. The horse was said to be native to Ethiopia, with large wings, a reddish coat, and a large singular horn.

== See also ==
- Hippogriff, a winged horse hybrid
- The Little Humpbacked Horse
