= Gná and Hófvarpnir =

Goddess and horse in Norse mythology

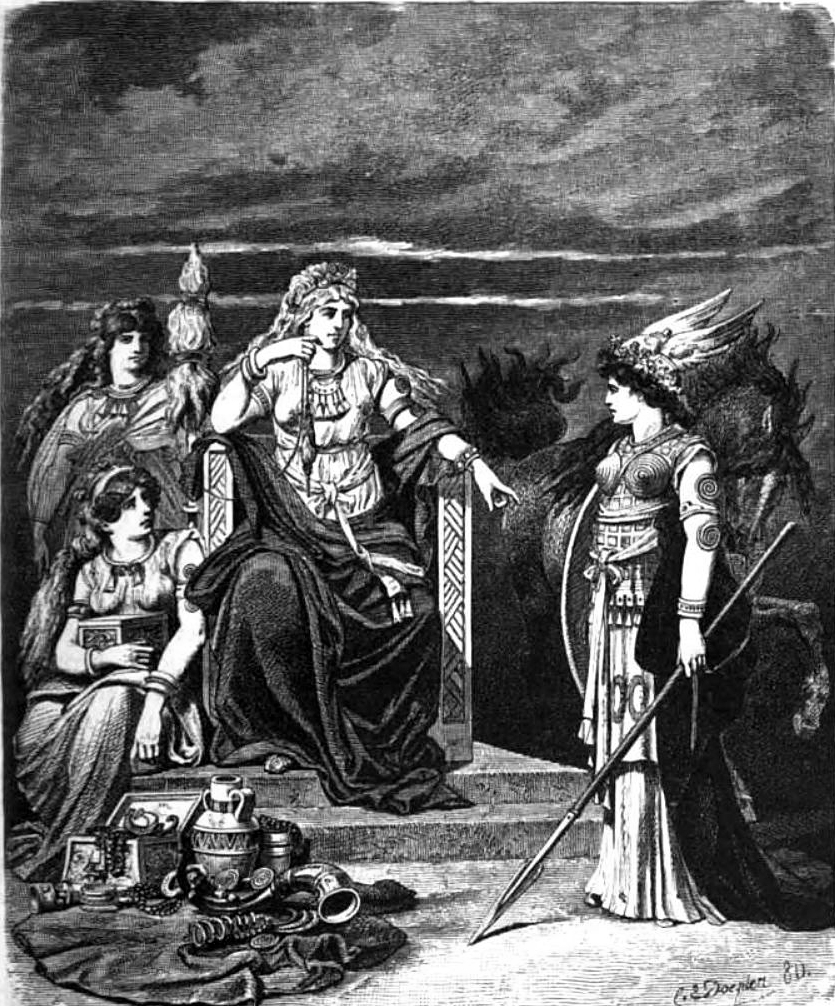
The goddess Frigg sits on her throne, accompanied by two goddesses: Fulla, holding a wooden box, and Hlín, standing and observing everything. Facing them are the warrior goddess Gná and her horse Hófvarpnir. Illustration by Carl Emil Doepler (1882).

In Norse mythology, Gná (Old Norse) is a goddess who runs errands in other worlds for the goddess Frigg and rides the flying, sea-treading horse Hófvarpnir (Old Norse "he who throws his hoofs about", "hoof-thrower" or "hoof kicker"). Gná and Hófvarpnir are attested in the Prose Edda, written in the 13th century by Snorri Sturluson. Scholarly have proposed that Gná is a "goddess of fullness" and, in the 1800s, as potentially cognate to Fama from Roman mythology. Hófvarpnir and the eight-legged steed Sleipnir have been cited examples of transcendent horses in Norse mythology.

== Attestations ==
In chapter 35 of the Prose Edda book Gylfaginning, the enthroned figure of High provides brief descriptions of 16 ásynjur. High lists Gná thirteenth, and says that Frigg sends her off to different worlds to run errands. High adds that Gná rides the horse Hófvarpnir, and that this horse has the ability to ride through the air and atop the sea. High continues that "once some Vanir saw her path as she rode through the air" and that an unnamed one of these Vanir says, in verse:

"What flies there?
What fares there?
or moves through the air?"

Gná responds in verse, in doing so providing the parentage of Hófvarpnir; the horses Hamskerpir and Garðrofa:

"I fly not
though I fare
and move through the air
on Hofvarpnir
the one whom Hamskerpir got
with Gardrofa."

The source for these stanzas is not provided and they are otherwise unattested. High ends his description of Gná by saying that "from Gna's name comes the custom of saying that something gnaefir [looms] when it rises up high." In the Prose Edda book Skáldskaparmál, Gná is included among a list of 27 ásynjur names.

== Reception ==
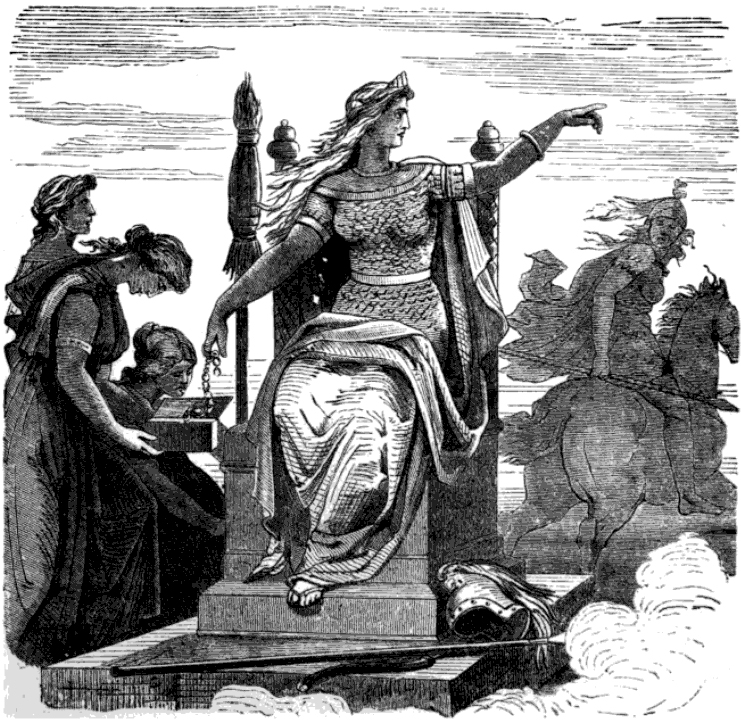
Frigg sends Gná, riding on Hófvarpnir, on an errand in Frigg and her Maidens (1902).

Rudolf Simek says that the etymology that Snorri presents in Gylfaginning for the name Gná may not be correct, yet it is unclear what the name may otherwise mean, though Gná has also been etymologically theorized as a "goddess of fullness." John Lindow calls the verse exchange between the Vanir and Gná "strange" and points out that it's unclear why it should specifically be the Vanir that witness Gná flying through the air.

Ulla Loumand cites Hófvarpnir and the eight-legged horse Sleipnir as "prime examples" of horses in Norse mythology as being able to "mediate between earth and sky, between Ásgarðr, Miðgarðr and Útgarðr and between the world of mortal men and the underworld." In the 19th century, Jacob Grimm proposed a cognate in the personified rumor in Roman mythology; Fama. However, Grimm notes that unlike Fama, Gná is not described as winged but rather that Hófvarpnir, like the winged-horse Pegasus, may have been.

== See also ==
- Horses in Germanic paganism
- List of horses in mythology and folklore
