= Régis Boyer =

Régis Boyer (25 June 1932 – 16 June 2017) was a French literary scholar, historian and translator, specialised on Nordic literature and the Viking Age. From 1970 until his retirement in 2001, he was professor of Scandinavian languages, literature and civilisation at Paris-Sorbonne University, where he also served as director of the Institute of Scandinavian Studies.

== Biography ==
Régis Boyer was born in Reims on 25 June 1932. At age 20 he earned a degree in literature from the Nancy University, where he became interested in Scandinavian culture during a course held by Maurice Gravier. He served in the Algerian War for 15 months before resuming his studies.

He took an agrégation in modern literature in 1959, after which he left France to teach French literature at the University of Łódź (1959–1961), University of Iceland (1961–1963), Lund University (1963–1964) and Uppsala University (1964–1970).

In 1970 he returned to France to obtain his doctorate and to teach at the Paris-Sorbonne University, where he became a professor of Scandinavian languages, literature and civilisation and served as director of the Institute of Scandinavian Studies until his retirement in 2001. He was known as a specialist on the Viking Age.

Among his translations into French are many Old Norse sagas and the Poetic Edda, and modern works by Nordic writers such as Knut Hamsun, Pär Lagerkvist, Halldór Laxness, Henrik Ibsen, Hans Christian Andersen and August Strindberg.

He died from a cardiac arrest in his home in La Varenne-Saint-Hilaire on 16 June 2017.
