= John Lindow =

American philologist (born 1946)

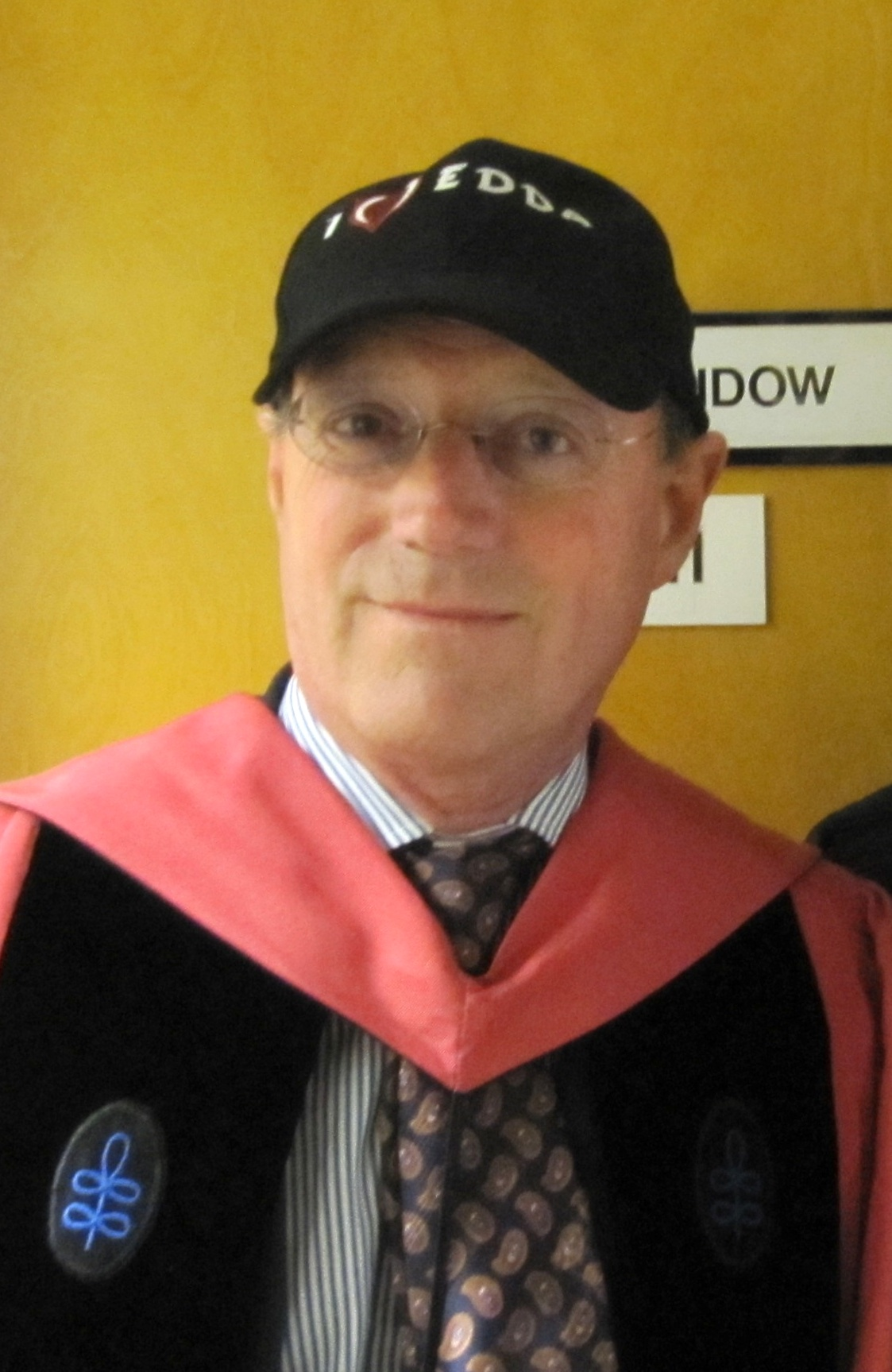
- Born: July 23, 1946 (age 80); Washington, D.C., U.S.
- Spouse: Katharine Forbes (m. 1968)
- Children: 2
- Awards: Knight's Cross of the Order of the Falcon (2018)

Academic background
- Education: Harvard University (AB, PhD)

Academic work
- Discipline: Germanic philology
- Sub-discipline: Old Norse studies
- Institutions: University of California, Berkeley
- Main interests: Old Norse religion and literature
- Notable works: Handbook of Norse Mythology (2001)

John Frederick Lindow (born July 23, 1946) is an American philologist who is Professor Emeritus of Old Norse and Folklore at University of California, Berkeley. He is a well known authority on Old Norse religion and literature.

== Biography ==
John Lindow was born in Washington, D.C., on July 23, 1946, the son of Wesley Lindow and Eleanor Niemetta. His father was a banker and his mother was a teacher.

John Lindow received his undergraduate degree at Harvard University, where he gained an A.B., magna cum laude, in 1968, and a PhD in 1972, both in Germanic Languages and Literatures.

After gaining his Ph.D, Lindow joined the faculty at University of California, Berkeley, serving as Acting Assistant Professor (1972–1974), Assistant Professor (1974–1977), Associate Professor (1977–1983), and Professor of Scandinavian (1983-?). He was since retired as Professor Emeritus of Old Norse and Folklore.

In 1977, Lindow was elected as a corresponding member of the Royal Gustavus Adolphus Academy. In 2018, he received the Knight's Cross of the Order of the Falcon at the Icelandic president's residence for scholarly contributions in the area of Icelandic medieval literature. He is also a member of the American Folklore Society, the Medieval Academy of America and the Society for the Advancement of Scandinavian Study. In 2013, he was a Fellow at the Swedish Collegium for Advanced Study in Uppsala, Sweden.

== Research ==
Lindow specializes in the study of Old Norse religion and literature. He is also an expert on Scandinavian folklore, Sami and Finnish mythology, and Inuit religion. Lindow's Handbook of Norse mythology was published in 2001. He was a co-editor of Pre-Christian Religions of the North: History and Structures, which was published in four volumes by Brepols (the last in 2020), and the author of Old Norse Mythology, which was published by Oxford University Press in 2021.

== Personal life ==
Lindow married Katharine Forbes, a teacher, on October 4, 1968, with whom he has two daughters.

== Selected publications ==
- Lindow, John (1976) Comitatus, individual and honor: Studies in north Germanic institutional vocabulary, University of California Press
- Lindow, John (1978) Swedish legends and folktales, Berkeley: University of California Press
- Myths and Legends of the Vikings, Bellerophon Books, 1980.
- Viking Ships, Belerophon Books, 1982.
- Scandinavian Mythology: An Annotated Bibliography, Garland Press, 1984.
- (Editor with Carol J. Clover) Old Norse-Icelandic Literature: A Critical Guide, Cornell University Press (Ithaca, NY), 1985, University of Toronto Press (Toronto, Ontario, Canada), 2005.
- (Editor with Lars Lonnroth and Gerd Wolfgang Weber) Structure and Meaning in Old Norse Literature: New Approaches to Textual Analysis and Literary Criticism, Odense University Press (Odense), 1986.
- Lindow, John (1997) Murder Vengeance among the Gods: Baldr in Scandinavian Mythology, Helsinki : Suomalainen tiedeakatemia, Academia Scientiarum Fennica
- (Editor with Carl Lindahl and John McNamara) Medieval Folklore: An Encyclopedia of Myths, Legends, Tales, Beliefs, and Customs, ABC-CLIO, 2000.
- Lindow, John (2001) Handbook of Norse mythology, Santa Barbara, Calif. also published as Lindow, John (2001). Norse Mythology: A Guide to the Gods, Heroes, Rituals, and Beliefs. Oxford University Press. ISBN 0-19-515382-0.
- Lindow, John (2014) Trolls: An Unnatural History. London: Reaction Books

== See also ==
- Rudolf Simek
- Gabriel Turville-Petre
- Hilda Ellis Davidson
- Georges Dumézil
- Edgar C. Polomé
- Andy Orchard

== Sources ==
- "John Frederick Lindow". Contemporary Authors. Gale. April 27, 2012.
