= Blóðughófi =

Horse of Freyr in Nordic mythology

In Nordic mythology, Blóðughófi (sometimes anglicised Blodughofi and meaning "Bloody Hoof" in Old Norse) is the horse of Freyr and is notable for his ability to pass safely through fire and darkness. He is attested in several þulur of horses.

== Attestations ==
=== Kálfsvísa ===
In Kálfsvísa, Blóðughófi is named in a list of horses, where their rider is specified as the "Slayer of Beli", a name for Freyr:

Dagr reið Drösli,
en Dvalinn Móðni,
Hjalmr Háfeta,
en Haki Fáki,
reið bani Belja
Blóðughófa,
en Skævaði
skati Haddingja.

— Old Norse text
Translation:

Dagr rode Drösull,
And Dvalinn rode Módnir;
Hjálmthér, Háfeti;
Haki rode Fákr;
The Slayer of Beli
Rode Blódughófi,
And Skævadr was ridden
By the Ruler of Haddings.

— Modern English Translation

=== Þorgrímsþula ===
In Þorgrímsþula, Blóðughófi is named among a list of horses:

Blóðughófi hét hestr,
er bera kváðu
öflgan Atriða,
Gísl ok Falhófnir,
Glær ok Skeiðbrimir,
þar var ok Gyllis getit.

— Old Norse text
Translation:

Blódughófi hight a horse
That they said beareth
The strength-eminent Atridi;
Gísl and Falhófnir;
Glær and Skeidbrimir.

— Modern English Translation

Here, they are described as being ridden by "öflgan Atriða", sometimes interpreted as a name of Freyr; however, the closely related spelling Atriða is used as a named of Odin.

=== Anonymous þulur ===
In one of the anonymous þulur, Blóðughófi is named in a list of horses, as the variant, Blóðhófr (Blood-hoof):

Móinn, hestr, fjǫtri, Móðnir, róni,
alsvartr, apli, askr, malfeti,
Blóðhófr, Hamskarpr, brúnn, Hófvarpnir,
viggr, Skinfaxi, virfill, Hrímfaxi.

— Old Norse text
Translation:

Brown one, horse, fettered one, Móðnir, gelding,
all-black one, foal, ash-tree, gravel-pacer,
Blóðhófr, Hamskarpr, black one, Hófvarpnir,
steed, Skinfaxi, virfill, Hrímfaxi.

— Modern English Translation

== Interpretation and discussion ==
In Skírnismál, Freyr gives Skírnir his horse, which is able to run through fire to reach Jötunheimar for the wooing of Gerðr; however, the horse here is not named.

The association between horses and Freyr is also seen in texts such as Hrafnkels saga, Vatnsdæla saga and Óláfs saga Tryggvasonar where horses are dedicated to the god; however, it has been noted that these sources are late and could be unreliable on this aspect.

== Popular culture ==
The title of Gerður Kristný's Blóðhófnir (2010), a poetic retelling of the myth of Gerðr, Freyr, and Skírnir, is a variation on the name Blóðughófi.

== See also ==
- Skíðblaðnir – Freyr's ship that always finds a fair wind is large enough to carry all the gods and their armour, and folds up small enough to fit inside a pocket.
- Gullinbursti – Freyr's glowing, golden-bristled boar that was crafted by dwarves and runs faster than any horse.
- Loki – The cunning trickster who transformed into a mare to lure Svaðilfari away, ultimately giving birth to Sleipnir.
- Svaðilfari – The colossal stallion of extraordinary strength and size who helped build Asgard's impenetrable walls and fathered Sleipnir.
- Sleipnir – Odin's legendary eight-legged steed, universally recognised as the fastest and greatest horse in existence.
- Skinfaxi and Hrímfaxi – The cosmic horses whose glowing mane and dripping bit bring day and night to the world, respectively.
- Árvakr and Alsviðr – The two horses tasked with pulling the blazing sun's chariot across the heavens each day.
- Gullfaxi – An incredibly fast, golden-maned horse won by Thor when he defeated the giant Hrungnir, and then gifted to his young son, Magni.
- Grani – The dragon-slayer Sigurd's fiercely loyal steed and a direct, fearless descendant of Odin's Sleipnir.
- Gulltoppr – The gleaming, gold-topped horse ridden by Heimdallr, the ever-vigilant watchman of the Æsir.

== Bibliography ==
=== Primary ===
- Orchard, Andy (2011). The Elder Edda: A Book of Viking Lore. London: Penguin Books. ISBN 9780141393728.
- Snorri Sturluson (2018). The Prose Edda. Translated by Brodeur, Arthur Gilchrist. Franklin Classics Trade Press. ISBN 9780344335013.
- Gade, Kari Ellen (2017). Poetry from Treatises on Poetics. Turnhout, Belgium: Brepols Publishers. ISBN 9782503518947.
- "Skáldskaparmál".

=== Secondary ===
- Simek, Rudolf (2008). A Dictionary of Northern Mythology. Translated by Hall, Angela. BOYE6. ISBN 9780859915137.
- Wills, Tarrin (2020). "Skaldic Project - Atriða". Skaldic Poetry of the Scandinavian Middle Ages.
