= Glaðr =

Horse in Nordic mythology

Glaðr (sometimes anglicised as Glad, Gladr, or Glath) is a horse in Nordic mythology. It is listed as among the horses of the Æsir ridden to Yggdrasil each morning in the Poetic Edda. The Prose Edda specifically refers to it as one of the horses of the Day (likely Dagr), along with Skinfaxi.

== Etymology ==
The Old Norse word Glaðr translates to English as "glad one", "shining one", or "bright one". It is derived from the adjective Proto-Germanic: *gladaz, meaning "bright", "shining" or "cheerful", and is cognate with modern English "glad".

== Attestations ==
=== Grímnismál ===
In the poem Grímnismál of the Poetic Edda, Glaðr is one of the horses ridden by the gods as they go daily to Yggdrasil:

Old Norse text	Bellows translation
Glaðr ok Gyllir, Glær ok Skeiðbrimir, Silfrintoppr ok Sinir, Gísl ok Falhófnir, Gulltoppr ok Léttfeti, þeim ríða æsir jóm dag hvern, er þeir dæma fara at aski Yggdrasils.	Glath and Gyllir, Gler and Skeithbrimir, Silfrintopp and Sinir, Gisl and Falhofnir, Golltopp and Lettfeti, On these steeds the gods shall go When dooms to give each day they ride To the ash-tree Yggdrasil.

=== Gylfaginning ===
A similar list of horses is given in Gylfaginning in the Prose Edda:

Old Norse text

Þriðja rót asksins stendr á himni, ok undir þeiri rót er brunnr sá, er mjök er heilagr, er heitir Urðarbrunnr. Þar eiga goðin dómstað sinn. Hvern dag ríða æsir þangat upp um Bifröst. Hon heitir ok ásbrú. Hestar ásanna heita svá: Sleipnir er baztr, hann á Óðinn. Hann hefir átta fætr. Annar er Glaðr, þriði Gyllir, fjórði Glenr, fimmti Skeiðbrimir, sétti Silfrintoppr, sjaundi Sinir, átti Gísl, níundi Falhófnir, tíundi Gulltoppr, ellifti Léttfeti. Baldrs hestr var brenndr með honum

Arthur Gilchrist Brodeur translation

The third root of the Ash stands in heaven; and under that root is the well which is very holy, that is called the Well of Urdr; there the gods hold their tribunal. Each day the Æsir ride thither up over Bifröst, which is also called the Æsir's Bridge. These are the names of the Æsir's steeds: Sleipnir is best, which Odin has; he has eight feet. The second is Gladr, the third Gyllir, the fourth Glenr, the fifth Skeidbrimir, the sixth Silfrintoppr, the seventh Sinir, the eighth Gisl, the ninth Falhófnir, the tenth. Gulltoppr, the eleventh Léttfeti. Baldr's horse was burnt with him

=== Skáldskaparmál ===
The Skáldskaparmál describes Glaðr being one of the horses of the day, or Dagr, along with Skinfaxi.

Old Norse text

Árvakr ok Alsviðr draga sólina, sem fyrr er ritat. Hrímfaxi eða Fjörsvartnir draga nóttina. Skinfaxi eða Glaðr fylgja deginum.

Arthur Gilchrist Brodeur translation

Arvakr and Alsvidir draw the Sun, as is written before; Hrímfaxi or Fjörsvartnir draw the Night; Skinfaxi and Gladr are the Day's horses.

The Þulur list Glaðr along with other horses such as Blóðughófi, Grani and Árvakr.

== Háttatal ==
In Háttatal, Glaðr is used as a heiti for a horse in a kenning for a ship. (Note: The kenning used for a ship is Old Norse: Glað Geitis - "Glað (Horse) of Geitir (a sea-king)".)

== See also ==
- List of horses in mythology and folklore#Germanic
- Horses in Germanic paganism

== Bibliography ==
=== Primary ===
- Bellows, Henry Adam (2004). The Poetic Edda: The Mythological Poems. Mineola, NY: Dover Publications. ISBN 9780486437101.
- Gade, Kari Ellen (2017). Poetry from Treatises on Poetics. Turnhout, Belgium: Brepols Publishers. ISBN 9782503518947.
- Sturluson, Snorri (2018). The Prose Edda. Translated by Brodeur, Arthur Gilchrist. Franklin Classics Trade Press. ISBN 9780344335013.
- "Grímnismál (Old Norse)". heimskringla.com.
- "Gylfaginning (Old Norse)". heimskringla.no.
- "Skáldskaparmál (Old Norse)". heimskringla.no.

=== Secondary ===
- Simek, Rudolf (2008). A Dictionary of Northern Mythology. Translated by Hall, Angela. BOYE6. ISBN 9780859915137.
- "gladaz". Wiktionary. 20 October 2020.
