= Horses of the Æsir =

Horses belonging to the 'gods' in Norse mythology

The Horses of the Æsir are horses present in Norse mythology which are ridden by the Æsir. Their main purpose is to be ridden daily to Yggdrasil in order for their riders to pass judgements. They are said to cross Bifröst along their journey. Among them is the famous Sleipnir which is the strongest one. They are mentioned in the Poetic Edda and the Prose Edda.

== Listing ==
The horses of Æsir are listed twice:

In the Eddic poem Grímnismál the following names are listed:

Glad and Gyllir,
Gler and Skeidbrimir,
Sillfrintopp and Sinir,
Gisl and Falhofnir,
Gulltopp and Lettfeti;
on these steeds the Æsir
each day ride,
when they to council go,
at Yggdrasil’s ash.

— Grímnismál (30), Thorpe's translation,

Snorri Sturluson the author of the Gylfaginning paraphrases this stanza in his Gylfaginning:

Each day the Æsir ride thither up over Bifröst, which is also called the Æsir's Bridge. These are the names of the Æsir's steeds: Sleipnir is best, which Odin has; he has eight feet. The second is Gladr, the third Gyllir, the fourth Glenr, the fifth Skeidbrimir, the sixth Silfrintoppr, the seventh Sinir, the eighth Gisl, the ninth Falhófnir, the tenth Gulltoppr, the eleventh Léttfeti. Baldr's horse was burnt with him; and Thor walks to the judgment.

— Gylfaginning (15), Brodeur's translation,

Apart from Odin's eight-legged horse Sleipnir, and Gulltoppr, who belongs to Heimdallr according to the Prose Edda, nothing is known about these horses, especially their owner other than that they are ridden by the Æsir. These names aren't listed in the þulur.

Other horses are mentioned elsewhere: Gullfaxi, which originally belonged to Hrungnir. Who was given by Thor to his son Magni after he killed the jötunn (Skáldskaparmál, 17), Blóðughófi, which belongs to Freyr (Kálfsvísa) and Hófvarpnir, which is ridden by Gná (Gylfaginning, 35).

== Meanings ==
- Blóðughófi: "Bloody-hoof";
- Falhófnir: "Hairy-hoof" or "Hidden-hoof", i.e. whose hoofs are covered with hair, or "Pale-hoof";
- Gulltoppr: "Gold-tuft";
- Gísl: related to "beam", "ray";
- Glaðr: "Glad" or "Bright";
- Glær: "Clear", "Glassy";
- Gullfaxi: "Golden-mane"
- Gyllir: "Golden";
- Hófvarpnir : "Hoof-thrower";
- Léttfeti: "Light-foot";
- Silfrintoppr: "Silver-tuft";
- Sinir: "Sinewy";
- Skeiðbrimir: "the one which snorts as he runs";
- Sleipnir: "trickster";

== See also ==
- Second Merseburg Charm, in which the gods heal a hurt horse
- List of horses in mythology and folklore
