= List of horses in mythology and folklore =

This is a list of horses in mythology and folklore. Fictive horses of historical figures (Note: e.g. Veillantif.) or horses with fictive history added by romancers (Note: e.g. Red Hare.) may be cross-listed under List of historical horses. (Note: Cf. Babieca of the Cid, Bucephalus of Alexander for horses of historical figures.)

== British ==
- Arondel, Bevis's horse in the Middle English romance Bevis of Hampton
- Arondiel, ridden by Fergus of Galloway, later he rides Flori In the Middle Dutch Ferguut the horse is Pennevare.
- Swallow, mare of Hereward the Wake

=== Arthurian ===
- Assile, Assyle, horse of Arthur of Little Britain (Brittany), (Note: A descendant of Lancelot.) in Artus de Bretagne
- Aubagu, horse of Arthur in Erec.
- Bel Joeor, Beau Joueur, Tristan's horse in Béroul's Tristan. Cf. Passe-Brewel
- Gringolet, Sir Gawain's horse. Gwalchmai's horse is Keincaled in the Welsh Triads
- Hengroen, King Arthur's horse in Culhwch ac Olwen
- Llamrei, King Arthur's mare in Culhwch ac Olwen
- Lorigal, horse born after Eliavrés the magician was forced to mate with a mare in the First Perceval Continuation (Livre de Caradoc).
- Passe-Brewel (Malory), horse of Tristan. Also Passebruel (Prose Tristan), Passabrunello in the Italian version. (Note: "Passebruel" is normalized spelling. The Old French manuscript reading is given as "Passebroill, Passebreui")
- Passelande, Arthur's horse in Béroul's Tristan.

=== Orkney and Shetland ===
- The Nuckelavee, an Orcadian horse with no skin which sometimes appears to have a man astride its body
- Nuggle, a mischievous water horse, in Shetland folklore
- Tangie, a seaweed covered water horse, in Orcadian and Shetlandic folklore

== Celtic ==
- Aonbarr or Enbarr, the horse of Manannán, borrowed by Lugh on a loan, which could travel both land and sea
- Du y Moroedd, mentioned in the Welsh Triads for carrying seven and a half men on his back across the sea. Also mentioned in the tale of Culwch and Olwen, he is the only horse that can bear Gwyn ap Nudd on his back.
- Ceffyl Dŵr, a malevolent water horse in Welsh folklore
- Each-uisge, a malevolent water horse in Irish and Scottish folklore
- Kelpie, a mythical Scottish water horse
- Liath Macha and Dub Sainglend, or Macha's Grey, Cú Chulainn's chariot horse; known as the king of all horses
- March Malaen, from Celtic mythology
- Morvarc'h, the horse of Gradlon in Breton legend
- Púca, a shapeshifting, sea creature, known for appearing as a horse
- The Tangle-Coated Horse/Earthshaker, an Otherworld horse belonging to Fionn mac Cumhaill

== French ==
- Baucent, Bauçant, horse of Bréhus that became Ogier's. This same horse is called Marchevalee in Bulfinch's retelling (Note: However, Marchevallée in the fragment of Déliverance Ogier appears to be a horse of the Sultan of Babylon which Ogier's nephew Gautier obtains after a successful siege and gives to Ogier. The Sultan ransoms it back in exchange of fine armor.)
- Bayard, a magic bay horse in the legends derived from the medieval chansons de geste. Particularly Renaud de Montauban's.
- Broiefort, Ogier the Dane's horse. (Note: Beiffror in Bulfinch.) The horse of Ugieri is Rondel, Rondello in Italian versions.
- Ferrant d'Espaigne, Feraunt of Spayne, horse of Fierabras. Oliver obtains Ferrant after they fight.
- Gaignon (Anglo-Norman: Gaignun, "guard dog"), of Sarcen King Marsile in The Song of Roland
- Maigremor, the horse of Vivien, son of Beuve d'Aigremont and separated twin brother of Maugis the enchanter.
- Marchegai, horse of Élie de Saint Gille and son son Aiol
- Papillon, horse of Ogier, in the romance versions tying him to Morgan le Fay.
- Passevent, horse of Ogier, said to have fought Capalu according to Jean d'Outremeuse.
- Tachebrun, horse of Ganelon the traitor.
- Tencendur, warhorse of Charlemagne (d. 814) according to the 12th century Song of Roland.
- Veillantif of Roland (d. 778) as told in the 12th century Song of Roland. Orlando's horse is called Brigliadoro in the Italian version.

== Germanic ==
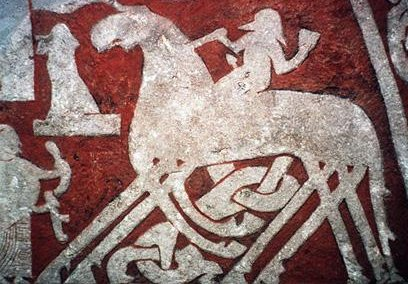
Depiction of Sleipnir in a detail on the Tjängvide image stone

- Árvakr and Alsviðr, horses that pull Sól's chariot
- Blóðughófi, Freyr's horse
- Falhófnir, a horse of the gods
- Falke (ON Falka), horse of þidrekr (Dietrich von Bern); sibling horse of Rispe and Schimming (qq.v).
- Glaðr, a horse of the gods
- Glær, a horse listed in both the Grímnismál and Gylfaginning
- Goti, horse of Gunnar (≈Gunther of the Nibelingenlied)
- Grani, the horse of Sigurð
- Gullfaxi or Golden Mane, originally owned by Hrungnir, given to Magni
- Gullfaxi in the fairytale "The Horse Gullfaxi and the Sword Gunnfoder"
- Gulltoppr, the horse of Heimdallr
- Gyllir, a horse whose name translates to "the golden coloured one"
- Hamskerpir and Garðrofa, the parents of Hófvarpnir
- Hófvarpnir, horse of the goddess Gná
- Hölkvir, horse of Högni (≈Hagen)
- Hrímfaxi or Rime-frost Mane, Nótt (Night)'s horse
- Leo or Lion, of Waltharius of Aquitaine.
- Lewe (Löwe, Lion), of Master Hildebrand.
- Skinfaxi or Shining Mane, Dagr (Day)'s horse
- Rispe (ON Rispa), Heime's horse.
- Schimming (ON Skemmingr), Witege's horse.
- Sleipnir, Odin's eight-legged horse
- Slungnir (aka Slöngvir), horse of King Adils of Sweden, stolen by Hrólfr Kraki
- Svaðilfari, the stallion that fathered Sleipnir

== Greek and Roman ==
Winged-Horses from Tarquinia, Etruscan Art, exhibited at National Museum of Tarquinia

- Aethon, names of various horses
- Arion, an immortal, extremely swift horse
- Balius and Xanthos, Achilles' horses
- Equuleus, Hippe transformed into a foal (now a constellation)
- Hippocampus, a sea horse that pulled Poseidon's chariot
- Mares of Diomedes, which fed on human flesh
- Pegasus, flying horse of Greek mythology
- Phaethon, one of the two immortal steeds of the dawn-goddess Eos
- Rhaebus, the horse of Mezentius in Roman myths
- Sterope, horse of the sun-god Helios
- Trojan Horse
- Xanthus, Podargus, Aethon and Lampus, Hector's horses, addressed by him in Iliad, Book 8, 157ff.

== Non-cyclic ==
- Brunsaudebruel, horse of King Embron, which recognized the king's son, Gullaume de Palerne

== Slavic ==
- Burko of Dobrynya Nikitich (Note: Also a horse named Voroneyushka Воронеюшка "Little Raven")
- Jabučilo, horse of Momčilo
- Šarac horse of Prince Marko of Serbian epic poetry
- Sivko-Burko, the "Gray-Brown" Horse of Slavic folktales
- Ždral (Ждрал, "gray horse") of Voivode Prijezda (војвода Пријезда) in "The Death of Duke Prijezda". (Note: Serbian: Smrt vojvode Prijezde: "Drvo, kamen i studeno gvoždje (The second treasure your gray horse)". Brkić, Jovan (1961) Moral Concepts in Traditional Serbian Epic Poetry, Mouton, p. 100.)
- Ždralin, horse of Miloš Obilić
- Calul Năzdrăvan, winged or swift advisor and horse of Făt-Frumos in Romanian fairy tales

== Asian ==
- Ak-kula, of Manas in the Epic of Manas
- Kurkik Jalali (Armenian: Քուռկիկ Ջալալի, the horse of Armenian epic, belonging to David of Sassoun, etc.
- Tikbalang, the demon horse in Philippine folklore
- Tulpar, the winged or swift horse in Turkic mythology

=== China ===
- Qianlima (translated as the "Thousand League Colt"), winged horse in Chinese mythology
- Red Hare, of Lü Bu (d. 199) according to history, but embellished as being taken by Cao Cao and subsequently gifted to Guan Yu according to the 14th century Romance of the Three Kingdoms.
- Tixue wuzhui, T'i-hsüeh wu-chu, 踢雪烏騅, "Ebony Steed Which Treads in Snow" of Huyan Zhuo in Water Margin
- Zhaoye yu shizi, Chao-yeh Yü-shih-tzu, 照夜玉獅子, "White Jade Lion That Glows in the Night" of Duan Jingzhu in Water Margin

=== India ===
- Dyaus Pita, a Vedic god who appears as a horse
- Keshi, a horse demon slain by Krishna in the Bhagavata Purana
- Uchchaihshravas, Indra's horse in Hindu mythology

=== Persia ===
- Rakhsh, horse of Rostam, the great Iranian champion
- Shabdiz horse of khosrow parvi, shah of Iran
- Gulrang, Golrang ("rose-red charger"), Faridun's horse as he rode out to strike the serpent-king Zahhak.

== Other ==
- Abjer, colt of Antar according to Antar, a Bedoueen Romance
- The horse of Sinterklaas: in the Netherlands "Amerigo" or "Ozosnel", in Flanders "Slechtweervandaag" ("Bad weather today")
- Ros Beiaard, a horse from Belgian folklore, still celebrated annually in many cities across the country
- Silili, a Babylonian goddess or divinity of horses
- Horses of Pas-de-Calais
- White horse of Kent
- Calul năzdrăvan ("magical horse") of Romanian folklore, see, e.g., "Făt-Frumos"

== See also ==
- Winged unicorn
- List of fictional horses
- White horses in mythology
- Winged horse

== Bibliography ==
- Bruce, Christopher W., ed. (1999). The Arthurian Name Dictionary. Taylor & Francis. ISBN 9780815328650.
- Düwel, Klaus (1988). "On the Sigurd Representations in Great Britain and Scandinavia". In Jazayery, Mohammad Ali; Winter, Werner (eds.). Languages and Cultures: Studies in Honor of Edgar C. Polomé. Berlin: Walter de Gruyter. pp. 133–156. doi:10.1515/9783110864359. ISBN 3-11-010204-8.
- Flutre, Louis-Fernand, ed. (1962). Table des noms propres avec toutes leurs variantes figurant dans les romans du Moyen Âge (in French). Paris: Centre d'études supérieures de civilisation médiévale (CESCM).
- Gillespie, George T. (1973). Catalogue of Persons Named in German Heroic Literature, 700–1600: Including Named Animals and Objects and Ethnic Names. Oxford: Oxford University. ISBN 9780198157182.
- Hopkins, Joseph S. (2021). "Phantoms of the Edda: Observations Regarding Eddic Items of Unknown Provenance in the Prose Edda". Folklore and Old Norse Mythology.
- Gade, Kari Ellen (2017). "Anonymous Þulur, Kálfsvísa". Skaldic Poetry of the Scandinavian Middle Ages. p. 663.
- Langlois, Ernest, ed. (1904). Table des noms propres de toute nature compris dans les chansons de geste imprimées (in French). Paris: Émille Bouillon.
- Rudolph, Alfred, ed. (1885). Vengeance Fromondin (in German). Marburg: N. G. Elwert. Endnote 58, pp. 31–45.
- Simek, Rudolf (2008). A Dictionary of Northern Mythology. Translated by Hall, Angela. BOYE6. ISBN 9780859915137.
