= Svaðilfari =

Horse in Nordic Mythology

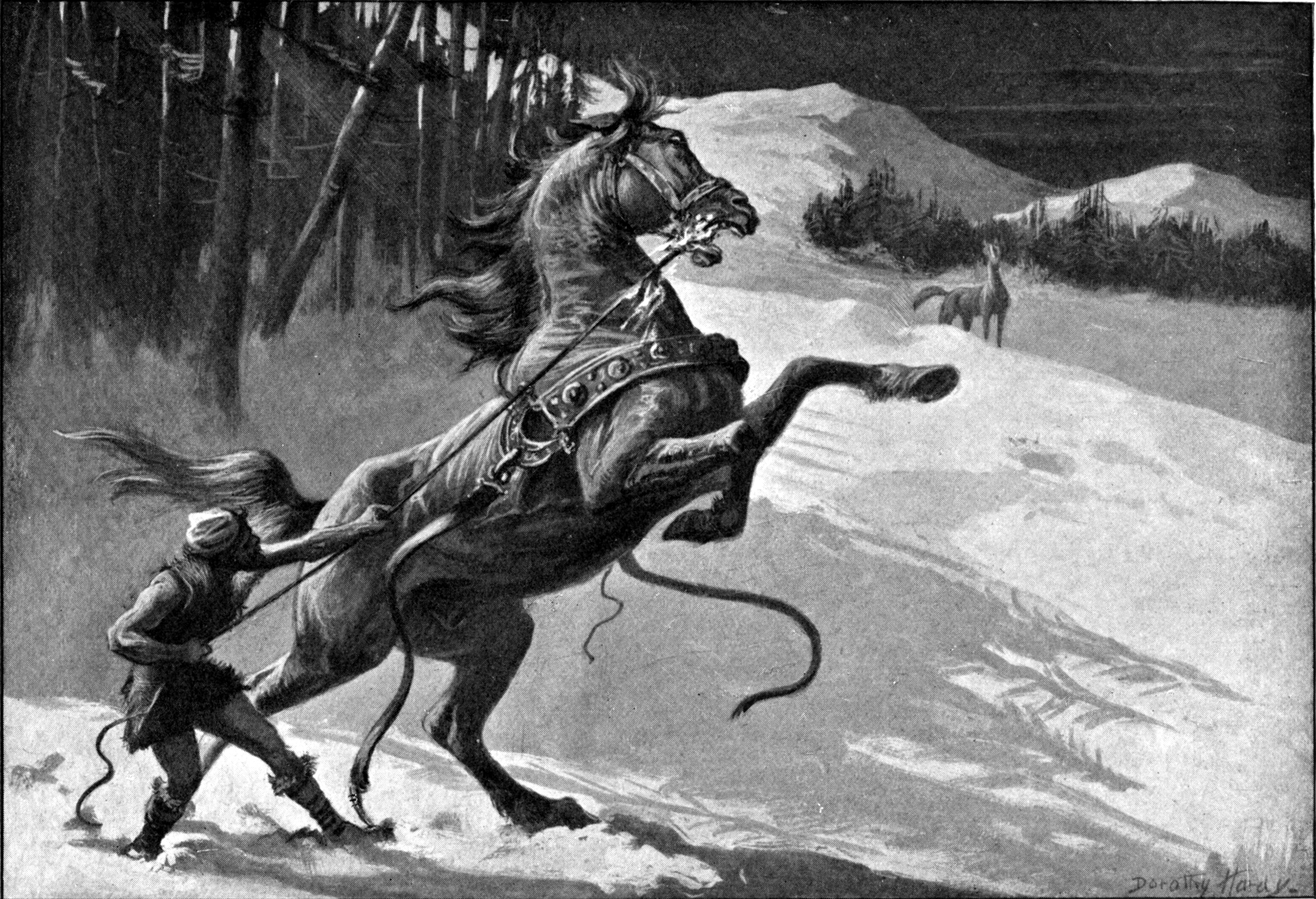
Loki and Svadilfari (1909) by Dorothy Hardy

In Norse mythology, Svaðilfari is a stallion that fathered the eight-legged horse Sleipnir with Loki (in the form of a mare). Svaðilfari was owned by the disguised and unnamed jötunn who built the walls of Asgard.

== Name ==
Svaðilfari in Old Norse translates as "the one making an unlucky journey" or "unlucky traveler".

== Attestations ==
=== Völuspá hin skamma ===
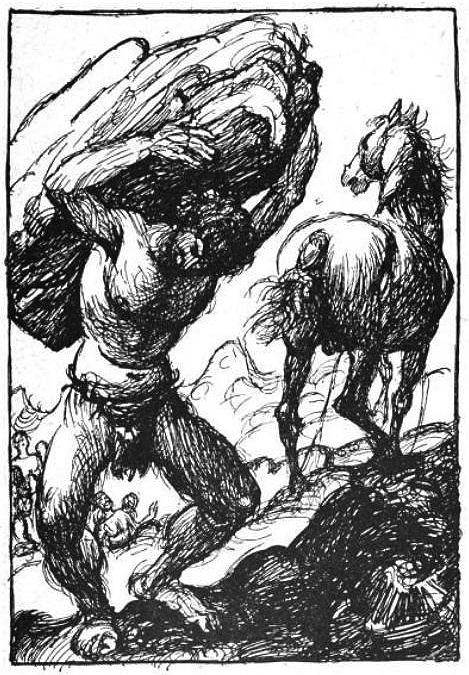
A depiction of the unnamed master builder with the horse Svaðilfari (1919) by Robert Engels.

Völuspá hin skamma, contained within Hyndluljóð, states that Svaðilfari fathered Sleipnir with Loki:

Old Norse text	Bellows translation
Ól ulf Loki við Angrboðu, en Sleipni gat við Svaðilfara; eitt þótti skass allra feiknast, þat var bróður frá Býleists komit.	The wolf did Loki with Angrbotha win, And Sleipnir bore he to Svathilfari; The worst of marvels seemed the one That sprang from the brother of Byleist then.

=== Gylfaginning ===
In chapter 42 of the Prose Edda book Gylfaginning, High tells a story set in the early days and after the gods had established Midgard and built Valhöll about an unnamed builder who offered to build a fortification for the gods to protect them from bergrisar and hrímþursar. Under Loki's advice, it was agreed that if the work was completed in one winter with the help of his horse Svaðilfari, the builder would be given Freyja, the sun, and the moon. With Svaðilfari's help, the builder made fast progress on the wall, and three days before the deadline of summer, the builder was nearly done.

Because of his role in the making of the wager, the gods declared that Loki would face severe repercussions if he did not think of a way to cause the builder fail to complete his task. That night, the builder drove out to fetch stones with Svaðilfari, and out from the woods, into the clearing, ran a beautiful mare who was, in fact, Loki in disguise. Svaðilfari saw the mare and became frantic, chasing her into the woods. As the two horses ran around all night, the building work could not be finished in time and realising this, the builder went into a rage (Old Norse: jötunmóð), revealing he was a bergrisi.

When the Æsir realised the builder's identity, they disregarded their previous oaths with the builder and called for Thor who killed the builder with Mjöllnir. Due to his night with Svaðilfari, Loki became pregnant and later gave birth to the eight legged horse Sleipnir.

== See also ==
- Horses of the Æsir
- Horses in Germanic paganism
- List of horses in mythology and folklore

== Bibliography ==
=== Primary ===
- Bellows, Henry Adam (2004). The Poetic Edda: The Mythological Poems. Mineola, NY: Dover Publications. ISBN 9780486437101.
- Faulkes, Anthony (1987). Edda. London: Dent. ISBN 0-460-87616-3.
- Orchard, Andy (1997). Cassell dictionary of Norse myth & legend. London: Cassell. ISBN 0-304-34520-2.
- "Gylfaginning (ON)". heimskringla.no.
- "Völuspá in skamma (ON)". heimskringla.no.

=== Secondary ===
- Simek, Rudolf (2008). A Dictionary of Northern Mythology. Translated by Hall, Angela. BOYE6. ISBN 9780859915137.
