= Silili =

Divine figure in the Epic of Gilgamesh

Silili is a divine figure mentioned in Tablet VI of the Epic of Gilgamesh. Gilgamesh objects to the unwanted attractions of the goddess Ishtar, enumerating the previous lovers of Ishtar, and the misfortunes which befell them. He claims that Ishtar once loved the horse, but ultimately decreed a number of misfortunes for him, including the continuous wailing of "his mother, Silili". Because Silili is only mentioned in passing, there is little to say of her character, other than she is a female divine figure closely associated with the horse.

Silili is named in Tablet VI, line 57 as "his mother, goddess Silili ("AMA-šú ^{d}Si-li-li).

== See also ==
- List of horses in mythology and folklore
