= Tjängvide image stone =

Viking Age image stone on Gotland, Sweden

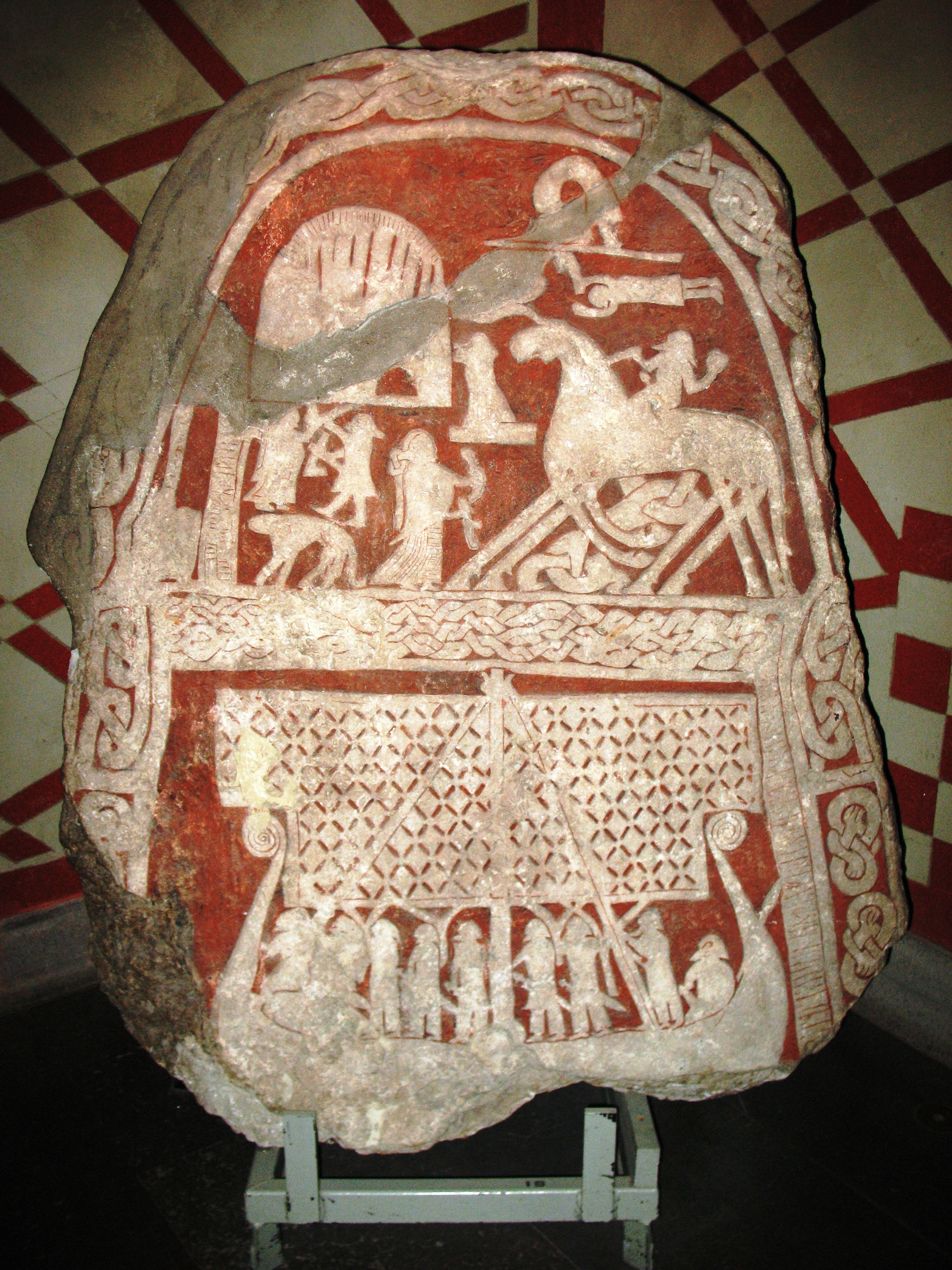
The Tjängvide image stone.

The Tjängvide image stone, listed in Rundata as Gotland Runic Inscription 110 or G 110, is a Viking Age image stone (made c. 700–900 CE), from Tjängvide (Swedish pronunciation: [ɕɛŋviːdɛ]), which is about three kilometers west of Ljugarn on the Swedish island of Gotland.

== Description ==
The inscription on the Tjängvide stone is carved on a flat slab of limestone which measures 1.7 metres in height, is 1.2 metres wide and 0.3 metres thick. The stone was discovered in 1844 on the farm of Tjängvide, and is located in the Swedish Museum of National Antiquities in Stockholm. The stone is probably pagan in origin as no trace of any Christian elements has been found on the inscription.

== Imagery ==
The stone is decorated with several figures in an upper and a lower field, which are separated by a braided pattern that resembles valknuts. In the upper field, there is a large eight-footed horse and a small rider who is offered a drinking horn by a woman, and there are also some other figures, such as a quadruped animal and some less discernible images.

The rider on his horse is usually identified with Odin on his eight-legged horse Sleipnir, or a dead man who is arriving at Valhalla on Odin's horse. The female figure is identified as a valkyrie. The images of the rider on the horse is used as the logo of the Swedish Museum of National Antiquities.

There are also alternative interpretations of the imagery. One interpretation, based upon the Volsunga saga, is that the rider is Sigurd who is riding on Grani (an offspring of Sleipnir) and that the welcoming woman is either Brynhild or Grimhild who is welcoming Sigurd to the court of the Gjukungs. This story was popular during the Viking Age and is depicted on other runestones and image stones known as the Sigurd stones. It is also possible that the eight legs symbolize the high speed of the horse and that the rider is a living man who is welcomed by his wife. The man behind the woman appears to carry a bow and he may represent the dead man who is hunting and the quadruped may be his dog.

The lower field of the stone is almost completely filled with the image of a longship with tall aft and stern. The sail is almost as wide as the ship is long.

It has been argued that the Tjängvide image stone has a phallic shape, and that similar combinations of death with erotic symbology occur on other Gotland rune and image stones.

== Inscription ==
The runic inscription to the left of the field is the runic row, but several of the runes are lost. In the runic inscription to the right of the lower field, half of the runes may be lost. The runic inscription does not separate the words from each other and the runes are short-twig runes. The name Hiorulf in the text translates as "sword wolf".

Below follows the inscription as it is presented by the Rundata project:

=== Transliteration ===
- A fuorkhn... ...fuþr-...
- B ... (r)aisti stainin aft iurulf bruþur sin ÷ sikuif(i)r(t)(u)(a)(n)k(i)sifil

=== Transcription into Old Norse ===
- A fuþork ...
- B ... ræisti stæininn æftiʀ Hiorulf/Iorulf, broður sinn ...

=== Translation in English ===
- A fuþork ...
- B ... raised the stone in memory of Hjôrulfr/Jórulfr, his brother ...

== See also ==
- Death in Norse paganism
