= Glenr =

Husband of Norse sun goddess Sól

In Norse mythology, Glenr (Old Norse" [ˈɡlenz̠], "opening in the clouds") is the husband of the goddess Sól, who drives the horses of the sun across the sky. It is stated that they were married on the order of Sól's parent Mundilfari.

In Gylfaginning Snorri Sturluson mentioned a story where his wife Sól and her brother Mani are born and in the same sentence tell that Glenr was married to Sól.

A certain man was named Mundilfariwho had two children; they were so fair and comely that he called his son Moon, and his daughter Sun, and wedded her to the man called Glenr. But the gods were incensed at that insolence, and took the brother and sister, and set them up in the heavens;

It is left ambiguous whether the act that offended the gods was the naming of the children or the marrying of Sól to Glenr.

Glenr is also an alternate name for Glær, one of the horses listed among those ridden by the gods, according to Gylfaginning.
