= English Runic Inscription 2 =

11th-century Viking Age runic inscription

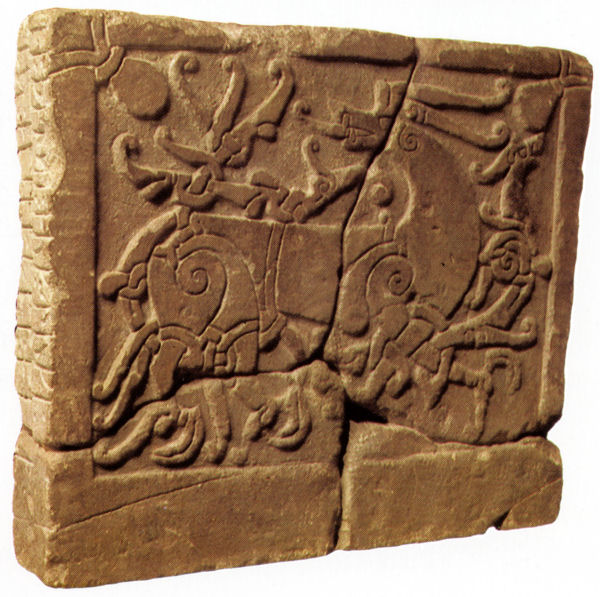

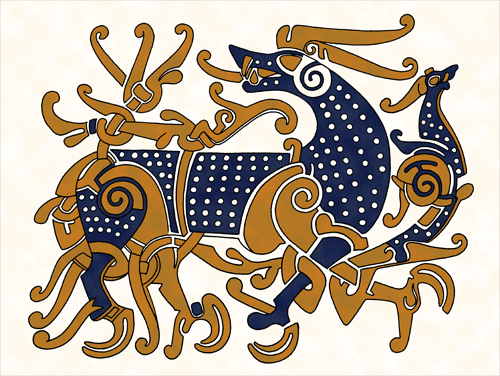
Illustration.

English runic inscription 2 (E 2, or Br E2) is a Viking Age runic inscription from the early 11th century, in a coffin of limestone in Saint Paul's Cathedral in London. The stone is in style Pr2, also known as Ringerike style. It has remains of dark blue and red colour. The stone is placed in the Museum of London.

It is possible that it was made in memory of a Viking warrior who died in service of King Canute the Great, and the creature on the stone may represent Sleipnir, Odin's eight-legged horse.

== Inscription ==
Latin transliteration:

: k-na : let : legia : st¶in : þensi : auk : tuki :

Old Norse transcription:

G[i]nna(?)/G[í]na(?) lét leggja stein þenna ok Tóki.

English translation:

"Ginna(?)/Gína(?) had this stone laid and (i.e. with) Tóki."

== See also ==
- England Runestones
