= Skinfaxi and Hrímfaxi =

Pair of horses in Norse mythology

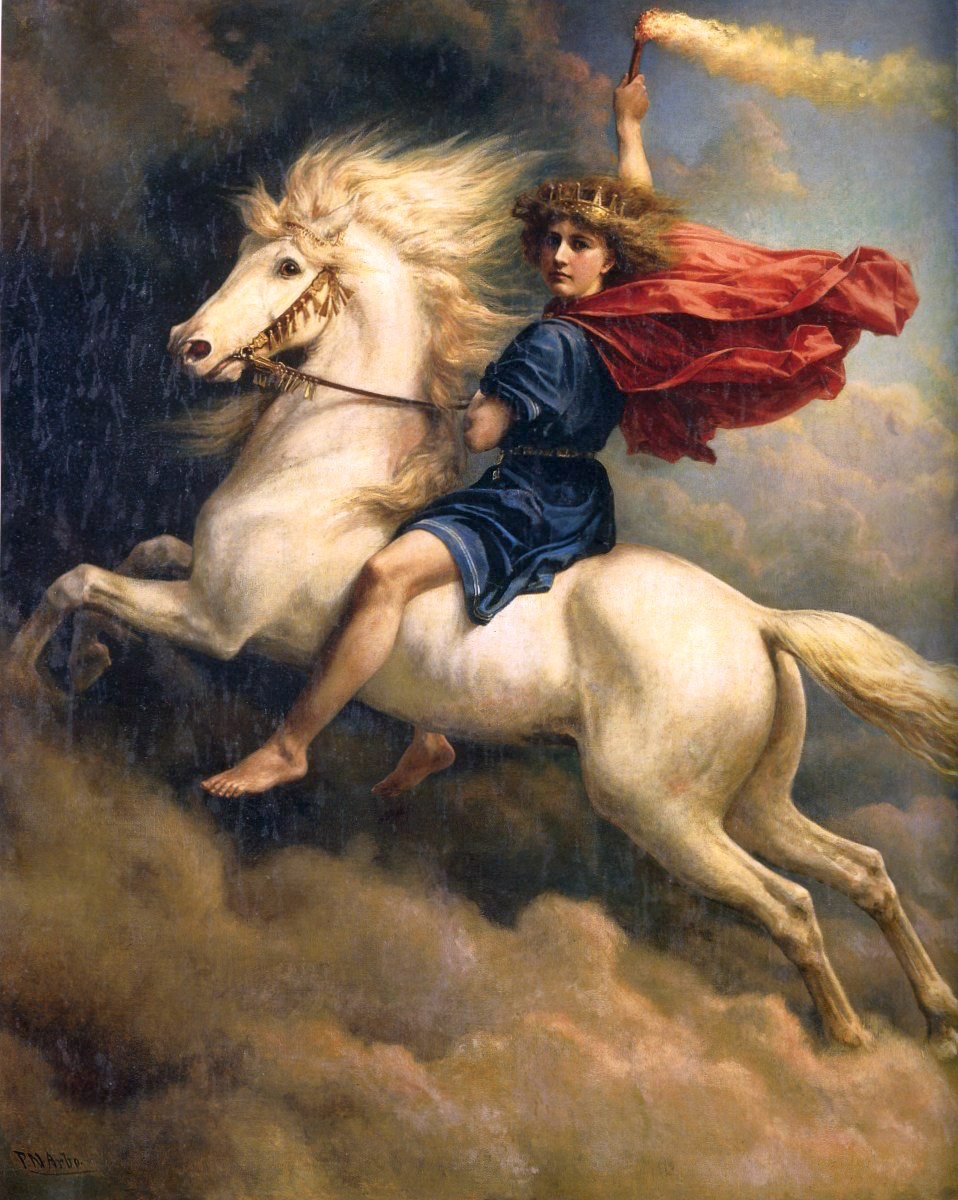
"Dagr" (1874) by Peter Nicolai Arbo.

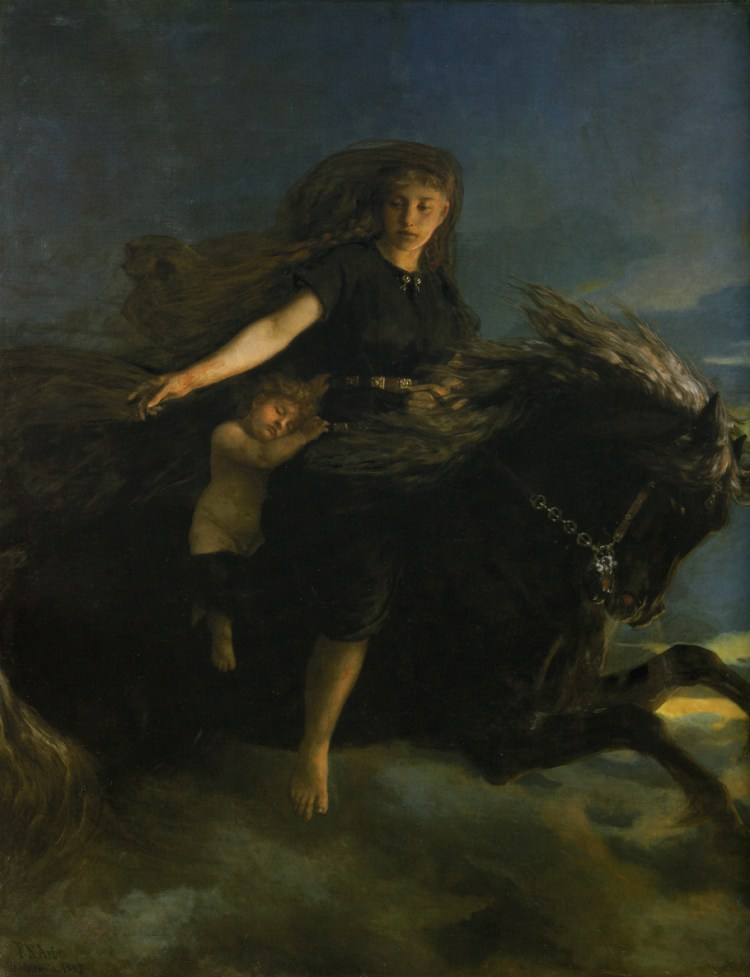
"Nótt" by Peter Nicolai Arbo.

In Norse mythology, Skinfaxi (Old Norse: [ˈskinˌfɑkse]) and Hrímfaxi [ˈhriːmˌfɑkse] are the horses of Dagr (day) and Nótt (night). The names Skinfaxi and Hrímfaxi mean "shining mane" and "frost mane", respectively. Skinfaxi pulls Dagr's chariot across the sky every day and his mane lights up the sky and earth below. "Froth" is believed to fall from Hrímfaxi's bit to the earth and become dew.

== See also ==
- Árvakr and Alsviðr, the horses that pull the Sun in Norse mythology
- Gullfaxi
- Horses in Germanic paganism
- List of horses in mythology and folklore
- Shadowfax, a horse in J. R. R. Tolkien's Middle-earth
- Skinfaxe (glacier)
- Rimfaxe (glacier)
