= Glær =

Norse mythological horse

In Norse mythology, Glær (transparent) or Glenr is a horse listed in both Grímnismál and Gylfaginning among the steeds ridden by the gods each day when they go to make judgements at Yggdrasil. However, in both poems Glær is not assigned to any specific deity.

== See also ==
- Horses in Germanic paganism
- List of horses in mythology and folklore
