= Gyllir =

Horse ridden by gods in Norse mythology

In Norse mythology, Gyllir (Old Norse: [ˈɡylːez̠]) is a horse listed in both Grímnismál and Gylfaginning among the steeds ridden by the gods each day when they go to make judgements at Yggdrasil. However, in both poems, Gyllir is not assigned to any specific deity.

Gyllir is also found in the thulur as a jötunn name.

== See also ==
- Horses in Germanic paganism
- List of horses in mythology and folklore
