= Árvakr and Alsviðr =

Pair of horses in Norse mythology

In Norse mythology, Árvakr (Old Norse "early awake") and Alsviðr ("very quick") are the horses which pull the sun, or Sól's chariot, across the sky each day. It is said that the gods fixed bellows underneath the two horses' shoulders to help cool them off as they rode.

Both horses are mentioned in Gylfaginning and Grímnismál and their names are frequently associated with descriptions of the Sun. In Nordic mythology, gods govern the passage of days, nights, and seasons, and shape the Sun from a spark of the flame Muspelheim, but the Sun stands still without a driver. Sól is kidnapped by the gods to drive the Sun in a chariot pulled by two horses. Two large bellows (ísarnkol; cold iron) were placed under the shoulders of the two horses to protect them from the immense heat of the Sun. Sól is unable to stop driving the chariot or else Sköll will catch the Sun and devour it; the Sun is expected to be caught and devoured on the day of Ragnarök.

Árvakr ok Alsviðr · þęir skulu upp heðan
svangir sól draga.
En und þęira bógum · fǫ́lu blíð ręgin,
ę́sir ísarn-kol.

— Grímnismál 37

“Early-waker and All-swift—they will henceforth, slender horses, pull up the sun.
And under their shoulders the blithe Powers, the Æsir, hid cool iron.”

The myth of the Sun pulled by horses is not exclusive to Norse or Germanic religion. Many other mythologies and religions contain a solar deity or carriage of the Sun pulled by horses. In Persian and Phrygian mythology, Mithras and Attis perform this task. In Greek mythology, Apollo performs this task, although it was previously performed by Helios. The myth of Árvakr and Alsviðr is thought to have inspired English dramatist and poet James Shirley's play The Triumph of Peace (1663).

== See also ==
- Skinfaxi and Hrímfaxi, the horses that pull Day and Night in Norse mythology
- Alcis (gods)
- Ashvins
- Horses in Germanic paganism
- List of horses in mythology and folklore
- Trundholm sun chariot

== Bibliography ==
- Simek, Rudolf (2007) translated by Angela Hall. Dictionary of Northern Mythology. D.S. Brewer. ISBN 0-85991-513-1
