= Sleipnir =

Odin's eight-legged horse

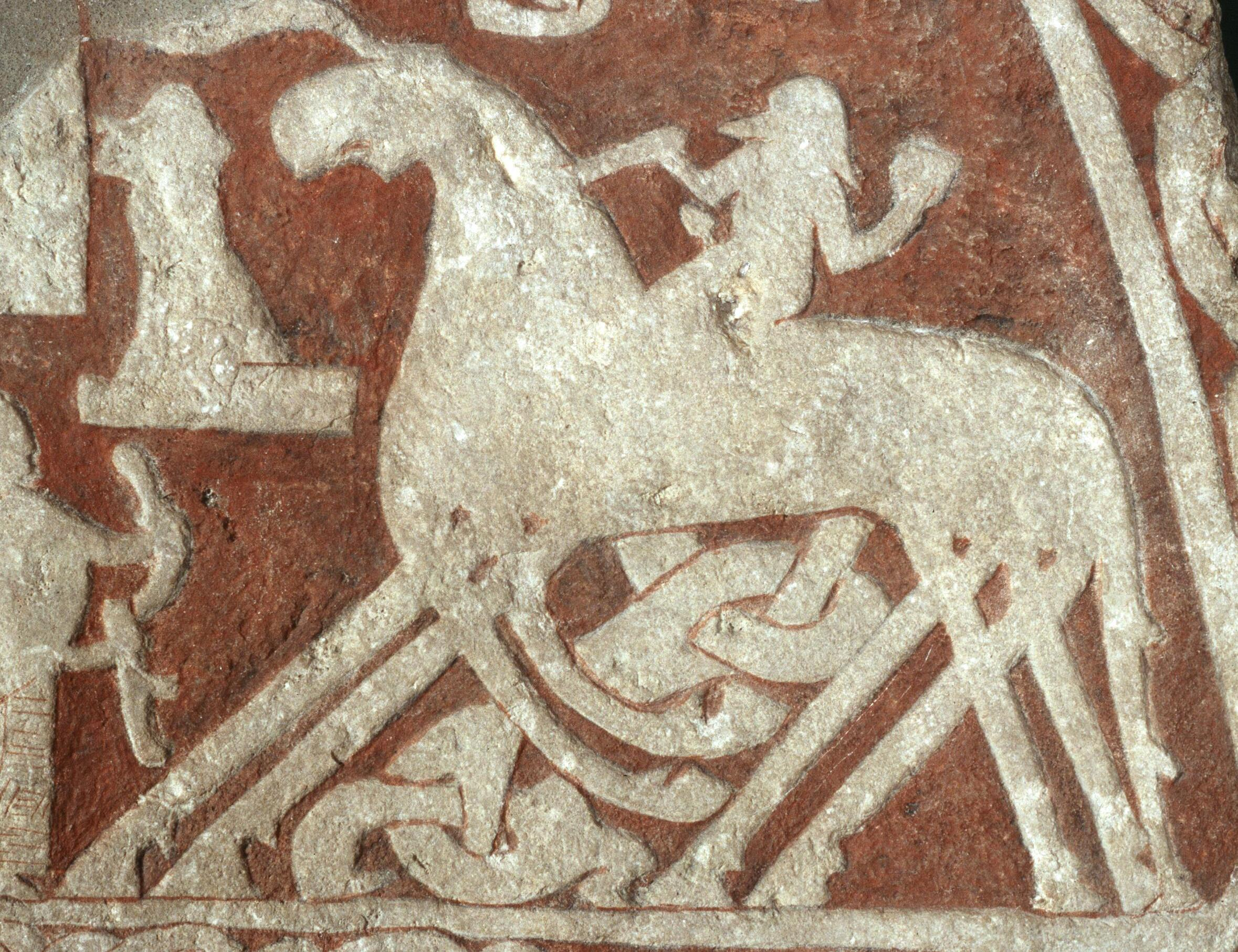
Depiction of Sleipnir in a detail on the Tjängvide image stone

In Norse mythology, Sleipnir /ˈsleɪpnɪər/ (Old Norse: "slippy" or "the slipper") is an eight-legged horse ridden by Odin. Sleipnir is attested in the Poetic Edda, compiled in the 13th century from earlier traditional sources, and the Prose Edda, written in the 13th century by Snorri Sturluson. In both sources, Sleipnir is Odin's steed, while also being the child of Loki and Svaðilfari. It is described as the best of all horses, and is sometimes ridden to the location of Hel. The Prose Edda contains extended information regarding the circumstances of Sleipnir's birth, and details that he is grey in color.

Sleipnir is also mentioned in a riddle found in the 13th-century legendary saga Hervarar saga ok Heiðreks, in the 13th-century legendary saga Völsunga saga as the ancestor of the horse Grani, and book I of Gesta Danorum, written in the 12th century by Saxo Grammaticus, contains an episode considered by many scholars to involve Sleipnir. Sleipnir is generally accepted as depicted on two 8th-century Gotlandic image stones: the Tjängvide image stone and the Ardre VIII image stone.

Scholarly theories have been proposed regarding Sleipnir's potential connection to shamanic practices among the Norse pagans. In modern times, Sleipnir appears in Icelandic folklore as the creator of Ásbyrgi, in works of art, literature, software, and in the names of ships.

== Attestations ==
=== Poetic Edda ===
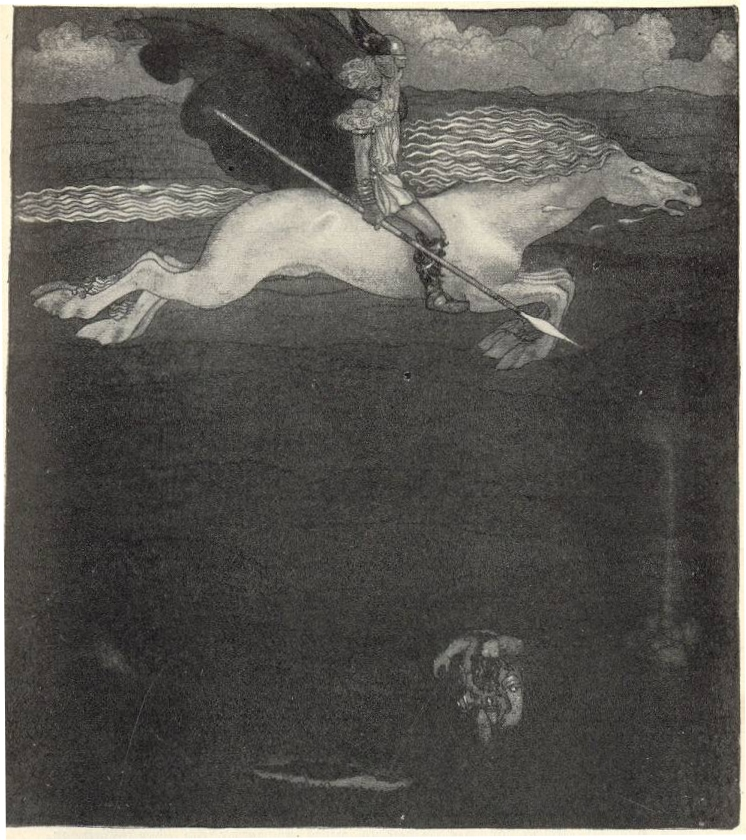
"Odin and Sleipnir" (1911) by John Bauer.

In the Poetic Edda, Sleipnir appears or is mentioned in the poems Grímnismál, Sigrdrífumál, Baldrs draumar, and Hyndluljóð. In Grímnismál, Grimnir (Odin in disguise and not yet having revealed his identity) tells the boy Agnar in verse that Sleipnir is the best of horses ("Odin is the best of the Æsir, Sleipnir of horses"). In Sigrdrífumál, the valkyrie Sigrdrífa tells the hero Sigurðr that runes should be cut "on Sleipnir's teeth and on the sledge's strap-bands." In Baldrs draumar, after the Æsir convene about the god Baldr's bad dreams, Odin places a saddle on Sleipnir and the two proceed to the location of Hel. The Völuspá hin skamma section of Hyndluljóð says that Loki produced "the wolf" with Angrboða, produced Sleipnir with Svaðilfari, and thirdly "one monster that was thought the most baleful, who was descended from Býleistr's brother."

=== Prose Edda ===
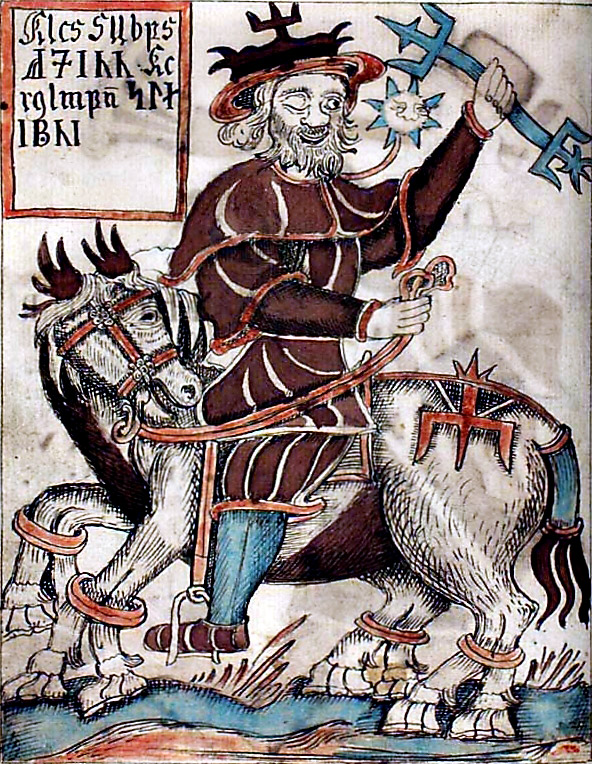
An illustration of Odin riding Sleipnir from an 18th-century Icelandic manuscript.

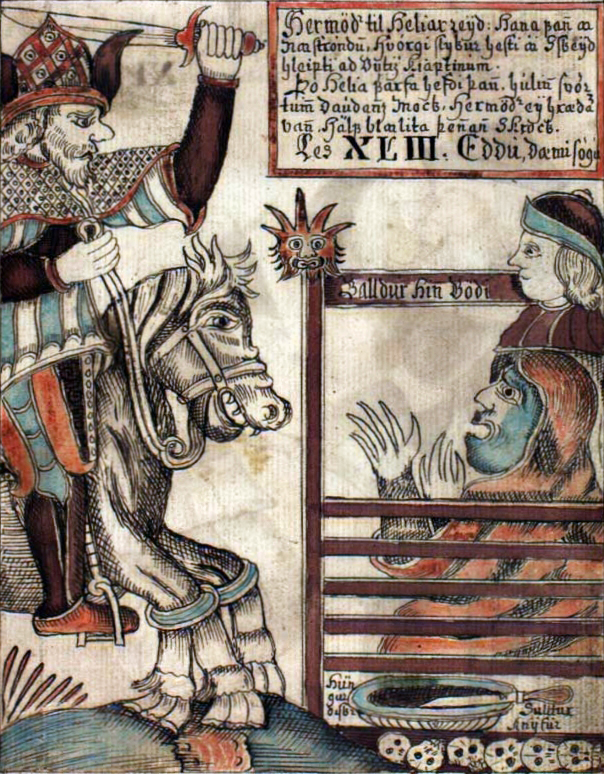
An 18th century Prose Edda manuscript illustration featuring Hermóðr upon Sleipnir (left), Baldr (upper right), and Hel (lower right).

In the Prose Edda book Gylfaginning, Sleipnir is first mentioned in chapter 15 where the enthroned figure of High says that every day the Æsir ride across the bridge Bifröst, and provides a list of the Æsir's horses. The list begins with Sleipnir: "best is Sleipnir, he is Odin's, he has eight legs." In chapter 41, High quotes the Grímnismál stanza that mentions Sleipnir.

In chapter 42, Sleipnir's origins are described. Gangleri (described earlier in the book as King Gylfi in disguise) asks High who the horse Sleipnir belongs to and what there is to tell about it. High expresses surprise at Gangleri's lack of knowledge about Sleipnir and its origin. High tells a story set "right at the beginning of the gods' settlement when the gods established Midgard and built Val-Hall" about an unnamed builder who has offered to build a fortification for the gods in three seasons that will keep out invaders in exchange for the goddess Freyja, the sun, and the moon. After some debate, the gods agree to this, but place a number of restrictions on the builder, including that he must complete the work within three seasons with the help of no man. The builder makes a single request; that he may have help from his stallion Svaðilfari, and due to Loki's influence, this is allowed. The stallion Svaðilfari performs twice the deeds of strength as the builder and hauls enormous rocks to the surprise of the gods. The builder, with Svaðilfari, makes fast progress on the wall, and three days before the deadline of summer, the builder was nearly at the entrance to the fortification. The gods convene and figured out who was responsible, resulting in a unanimous agreement that, along with most trouble, Loki was to blame.

The gods declare that Loki would deserve a horrible death if he could not find a scheme that would cause the builder to forfeit his payment, and threatened to attack him. Loki, afraid, swore oaths that he would devise a scheme to cause the builder to forfeit the payment, whatever it would cost himself. That night, the builder drove out to fetch stone with his stallion Svaðilfari, and out from a wood ran a mare. The mare neighed at Svaðilfari, and "realizing what kind of horse it was," Svaðilfari became frantic, neighed, tore apart his tackle, and ran towards the mare. The mare ran to the wood, Svaðilfari followed, and the builder chased after. The two horses ran around all night, causing the building work to be held up for the night, and the previous momentum of building work that the builder had been able to maintain was not continued.

When the Æsir realize that the builder is a hrimthurs, they disregard their previous oaths with the builder, and call for Thor. Thor arrives, and kills the builder by smashing the builder's skull into shards with the hammer Mjöllnir. However, Loki had "such dealings" with Svaðilfari that "somewhat later" Loki gave birth to a grey foal with eight legs; the horse Sleipnir, "the best horse among gods and men."

In chapter 49, High describes the death of the god Baldr. Hermóðr agrees to ride to Hel to offer a ransom for Baldr's return, and so "then Odin's horse Sleipnir was fetched and led forward." Hermóðr mounts Sleipnir and rides away. Hermóðr rides for nine nights in deep, dark valleys where Hermóðr can see nothing. The two arrive at the river Gjöll and then continue to Gjöll bridge, encountering a maiden guarding the bridge named Móðguðr. Some dialogue occurs between Hermóðr and Móðguðr, including that Móðguðr notes that recently there had ridden five battalions of dead men across the bridge that made less sound than he. Sleipnir and Hermóðr continue "downwards and northwards" on the road to Hel, until the two arrive at Hel's gates. Hermóðr dismounts from Sleipnir, tightens Sleipnir's girth, mounts him, and spurs Sleipnir on. Sleipnir "jumped so hard and over the gate that it came nowhere near." Hermóðr rides up to the hall, and dismounts from Sleipnir. After Hermóðr's pleas to Hel to return Baldr are accepted under a condition, Hermóðr and Baldr retrace their path backward and return to Asgard.

In chapter 16 of the book Skáldskaparmál, a kenning given for Loki is "relative of Sleipnir." In chapter 17, a story is provided in which Odin rides Sleipnir into the land of Jötunheimr and arrives at the residence of the jötunn Hrungnir. Hrungnir asks "what sort of person this was" wearing a golden helmet, "riding sky and sea," and says that the stranger "has a marvellously good horse." Odin wagers his head that no horse as good could be found in all of Jötunheimr. Hrungnir admitted that it was a fine horse, yet states that he owns a much longer-paced horse; Gullfaxi. Incensed, Hrungnir leaps atop Gullfaxi, intending to attack Odin for Odin's boasting. Odin gallops hard ahead of Hrungnir, and, in his, fury, Hrungnir finds himself having rushed into the gates of Asgard. In chapter 58, Sleipnir is mentioned among a list of horses in Þorgrímsþula: "Hrafn and Sleipnir, splendid horses [...]". In addition, Sleipnir occurs twice in kennings for "ship" (once appearing in chapter 25 in a work by the skald Refr, and "sea-Sleipnir" appearing in chapter 49 in Húsdrápa, a work by the 10th century skald Úlfr Uggason).

=== Hervarar saga ok Heiðreks ===
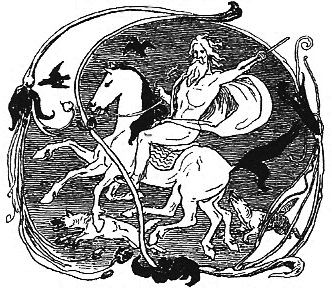
Odin sits atop his steed Sleipnir, his ravens Huginn and Muninn and wolves Geri and Freki nearby (1895) by Lorenz Frølich.

In Hervarar saga ok Heiðreks, the poem Heiðreks gátur contains a riddle that mentions Sleipnir and Odin:

36. Gestumblindi said:
"Who are the twain
that on ten feet run?
three eyes they have,
but only one tail.
Alright guess now
this riddle, Heithrek!"

Heithrek said:
"Good is thy riddle, Gestumblindi,
and guessed it is:
that is Odin riding on Sleipnir."

=== Völsunga saga ===
In chapter 13 of Völsunga saga, the hero Sigurðr is on his way to a wood and he meets a long-bearded old man he had never seen before. Sigurd tells the old man that he is going to choose a horse, and asks the old man to come with him to help him decide. The old man says that they should drive the horses down to the river Busiltjörn. The two drive the horses down into the deeps of Busiltjörn, and all of the horses swim back to land but a large, young, and handsome grey horse that no one had ever mounted. The grey-bearded old man says that the horse is from "Sleipnir's kin" and that "he must be raised carefully, because he will become better than any other horse." The old man vanishes. Sigurd names the horse Grani, and the narrative adds that the old man was none other than (the god) Odin.

=== Gesta Danorum ===
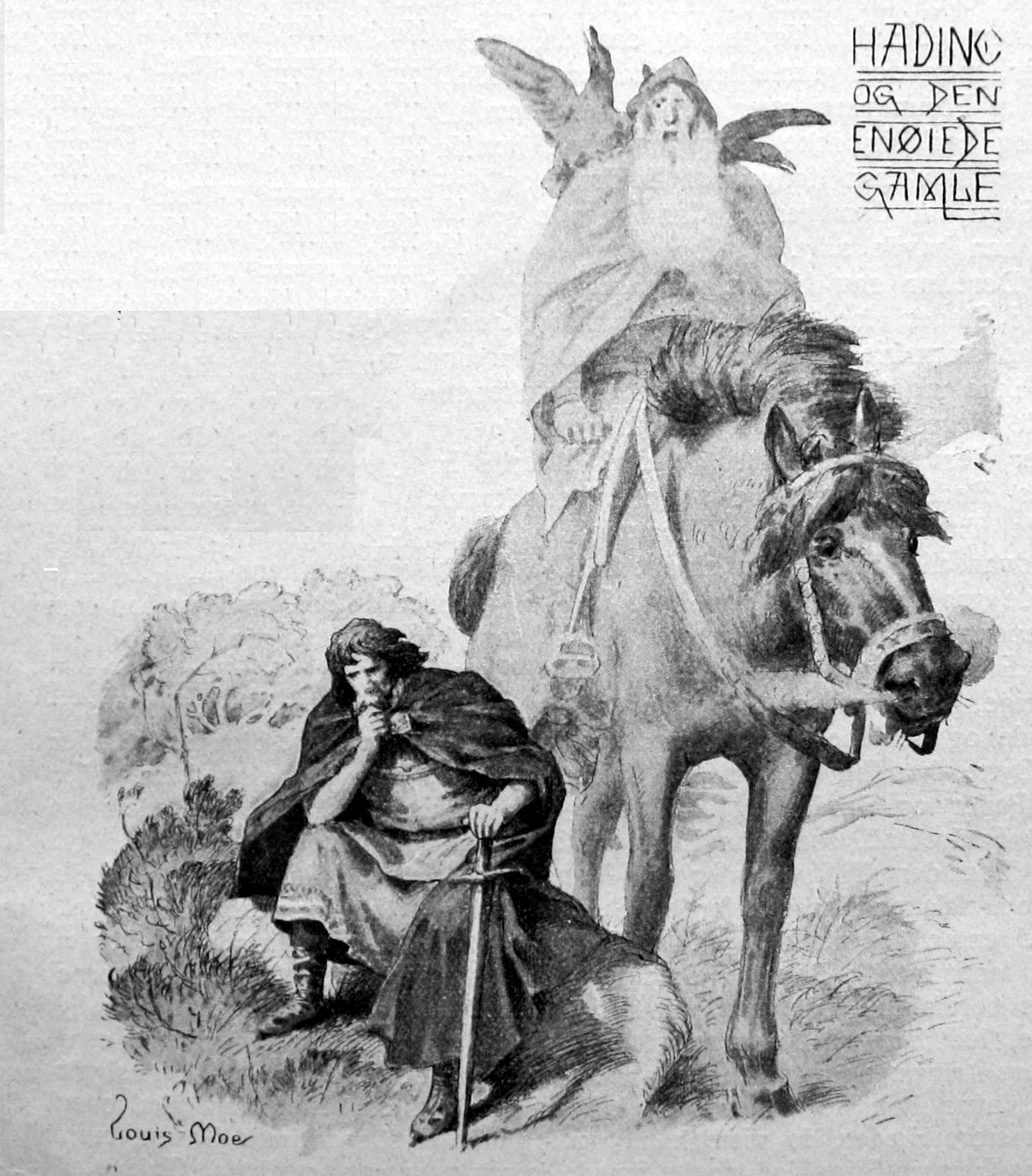
"Hadingus and the Old Man" (1898) by Louis Moe.

Sleipnir is generally considered as appearing in a sequence of events described in book I of Gesta Danorum.

In book I, the young Hadingus encounters "a certain man of great age who had lost an eye" who allies him with Liserus. Hadingus and Liserus set out to wage war on Lokerus, ruler of Kurland. Meeting defeat, the old man takes Hadingus with him onto his horse as they flee to the old man's house, and the two drink an invigorating draught. The old man sings a prophecy, and takes Hadingus back to where he found him on his horse. During the ride back, Hadingus trembles beneath the old man's mantle, and peers out of its holes. Hadingus realizes that Sleipnir is running over the sea: "and he saw that before the steps of the horse lay the sea; but was told not to steal a glimpse of the forbidden thing, and therefore turned his amazed eyes from the dread spectacle of the roads that he journeyed."

In book II, Biarco mentions Odin and Sleipnir: "If I may look on the awful husband of Frigg, howsoever he be covered in his white shield, and guide his tall steed, he shall in no way go safe out of Leire; it is lawful to lay low in war the war-waging god."

== Archaeological record ==
Two of the 8th century picture stones from the island of Gotland, Sweden depict eight-legged horses, which are thought by most scholars to depict Sleipnir: the Tjängvide image stone and the Ardre VIII image stone. Both stones feature a rider sitting atop an eight-legged horse, which some scholars view as Odin. Above the rider on the Tjängvide image stone is a horizontal figure holding a spear, which may be a valkyrie, and a female figure greets the rider with a cup. The scene has been interpreted as a rider arriving at the world of the dead. The mid-7th century Eggja stone bearing the Odinic name haras (Old Norse 'army god') may be interpreted as depicting Sleipnir. The English Runic Inscription 2 (11th century) is also believed by some scholars to depict Sleipnir.

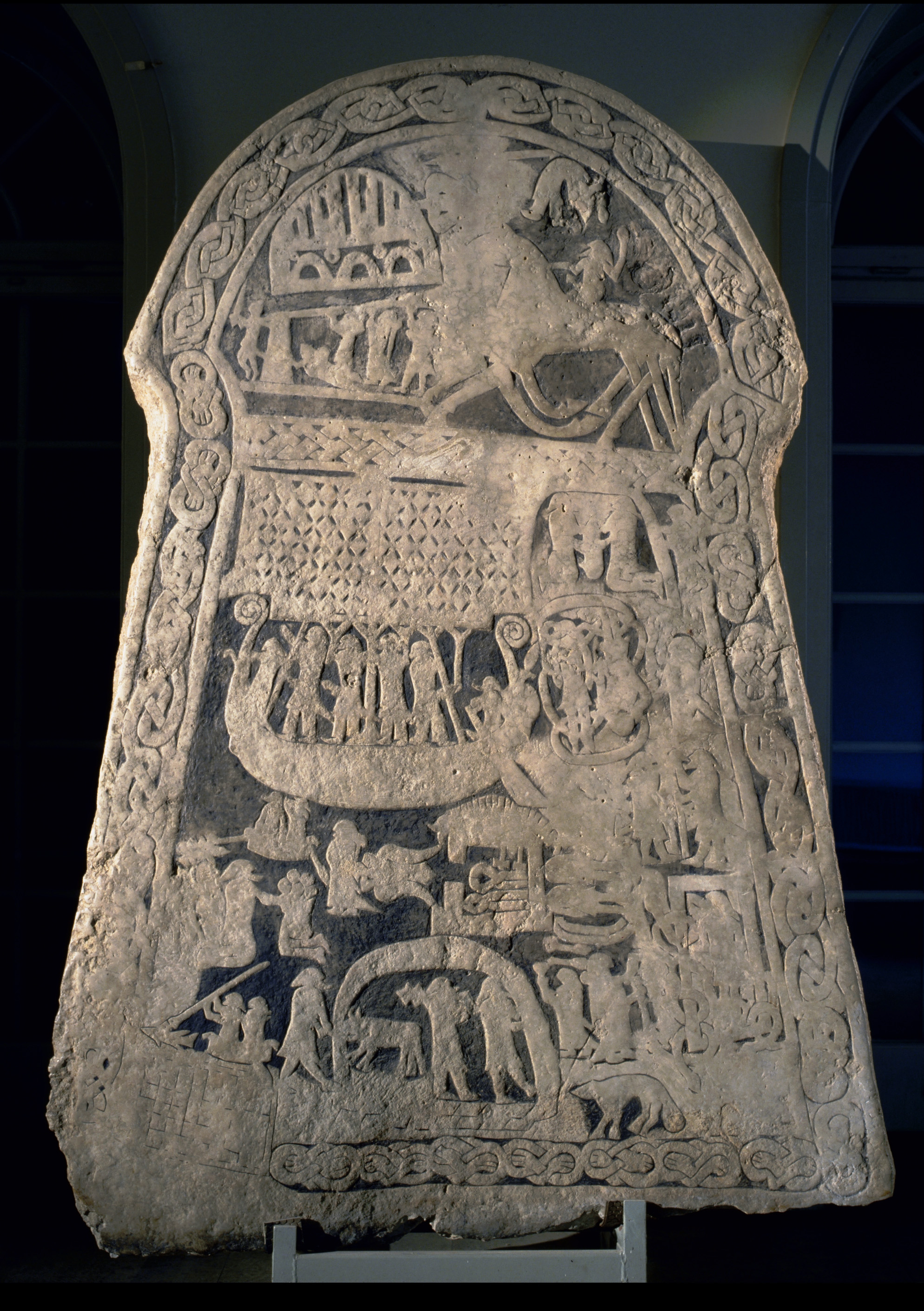
The Ardre VIII image stone

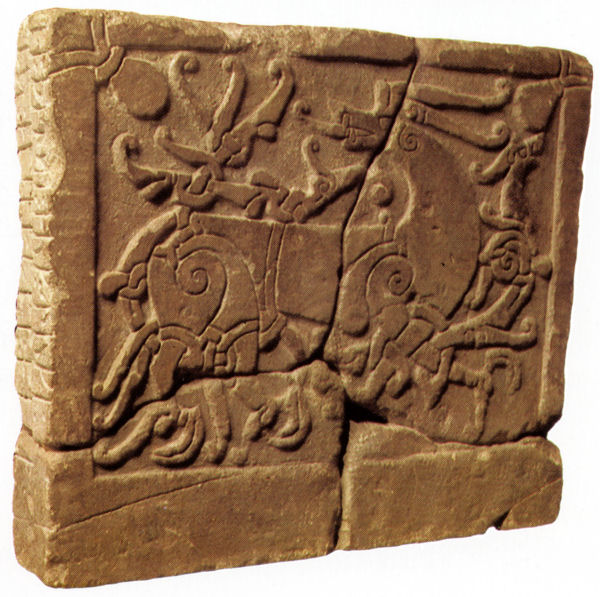
English Runic Inscription 2

== Theories ==
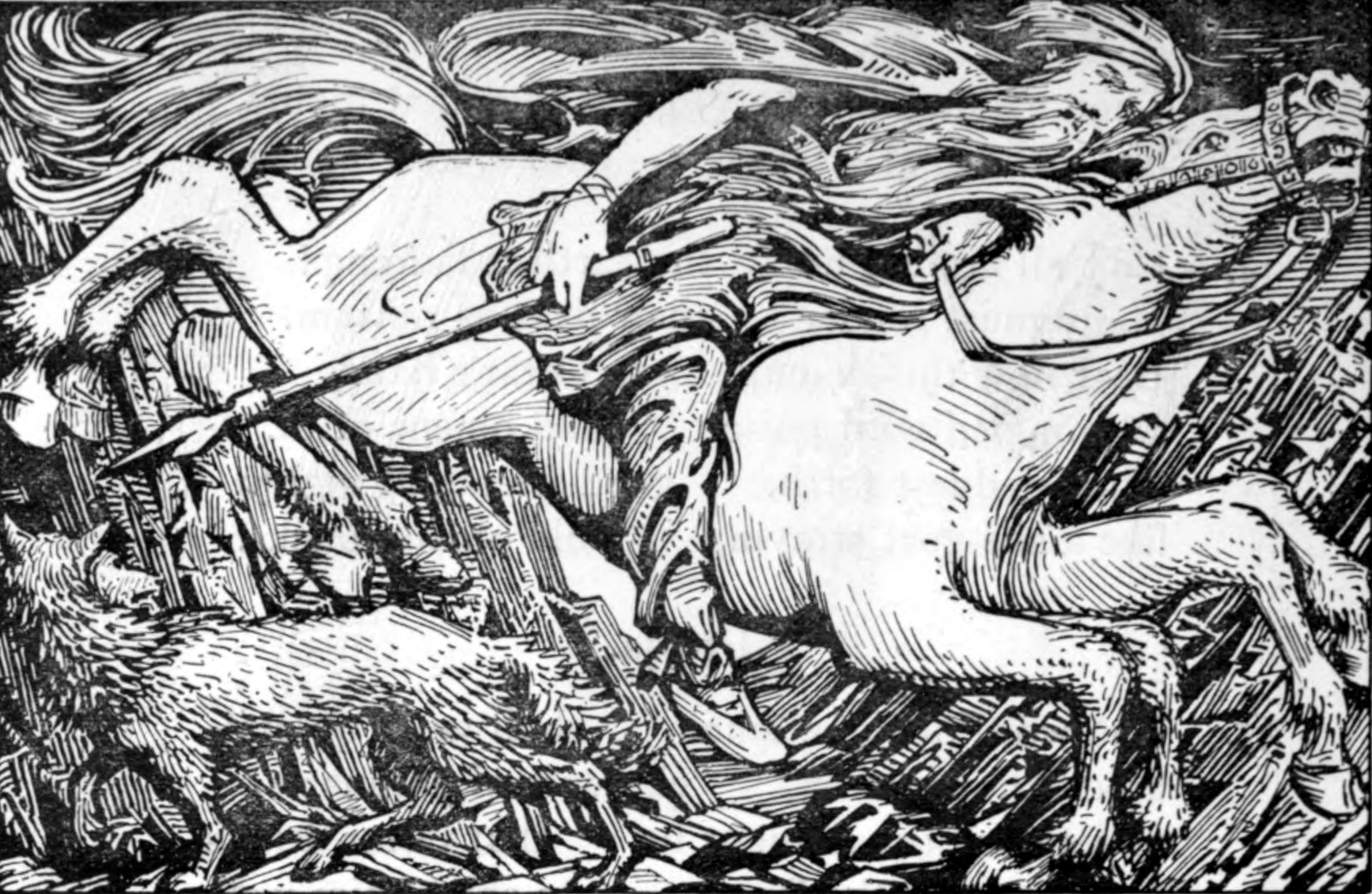
"Odin Rides to Hel" (1908) by W. G. Collingwood.

John Lindow theorizes that Sleipnir's "connection to the world of the dead grants a special poignancy to one of the kennings in which Sleipnir turns up as a horse word," referring to the skald Úlfr Uggason's usage of "sea-Sleipnir" in his Húsdrápa, which describes the funeral of Baldr. Lindow continues that "his use of Sleipnir in the kenning may show that Sleipnir's role in the failed recovery of Baldr was known at that time and place in Iceland; it certainly indicates that Sleipnir was an active participant in the mythology of the last decades of paganism." Lindow adds that the eight legs of Sleipnir "have been interpreted as an indication of great speed or as being connected in some unclear way with cult activity."

Hilda Ellis Davidson says that "the eight-legged horse of Odin is the typical steed of the shaman" and that in the shaman's journeys to the heavens or the underworld, a shaman "is usually represented as riding on some bird or animal." Davidson says that while the creature may vary, the horse is fairly common "in the lands where horses are in general use, and Sleipnir's ability to bear the god through the air is typical of the shaman's steed" and cites an example from a study of shamanism by Mircea Eliade of an eight-legged foal from a story of a Buryat shaman. Davidson says that while attempts have been made to connect Sleipnir with hobby horses and steeds with more than four feet that appear in carnivals and processions, but that "a more fruitful resemblance seems to be on the bier on which a dead man is carried in the funeral procession by four bearers; borne along thus, he may be described as riding on a steed with eight legs." As an example, Davidson cites a funeral dirge from the Gondi people in India as recorded by Verrier Elwin, stating that "it contains references to Bagri Maro, the horse with eight legs, and it is clear from the song that it is the dead man's bier." Davidson says that the song is sung when a distinguished Muria dies, and provides a verse:

What horse is this?
It is the horse of Bagri Maro.
What should we say of its legs?
This horse has eight legs.
What should we say of its heads?
This horse has four heads. . . .
Catch the bridle and mount the horse.

Davidson adds that the representation of Odin's steed as eight-legged could arise naturally out of such an image, and that "this is in accordance with the picture of Sleipnir as a horse that could bear its rider to the land of the dead."

Ulla Loumand cites Sleipnir and the flying horse Hófvarpnir as "prime examples" of horses in Norse mythology as being able to "mediate between earth and sky, between Ásgarðr, Miðgarðr and Útgarðr and between the world of mortal men and the underworld."

The Encyclopedia of Indo-European Culture theorizes that Sleipnir's eight legs may be the remnants of horse-associated divine twins found in Indo-European cultures and ultimately stemming from Proto-Indo-European religion. The encyclopedia states that "[...] Sleipnir is born with an extra set of legs, thus representing an original pair of horses. Like Freyr and Njörðr, Sleipnir is responsible for carrying the dead to the otherworld." The encyclopedia cites parallels between the birth of Sleipnir and myths originally pointing to a Celtic goddess who gave birth to the Divine horse twins. These elements include a demand for a goddess by an unwanted suitor (the hrimthurs demanding the goddess Freyja) and the seduction of builders.

== Modern influence ==
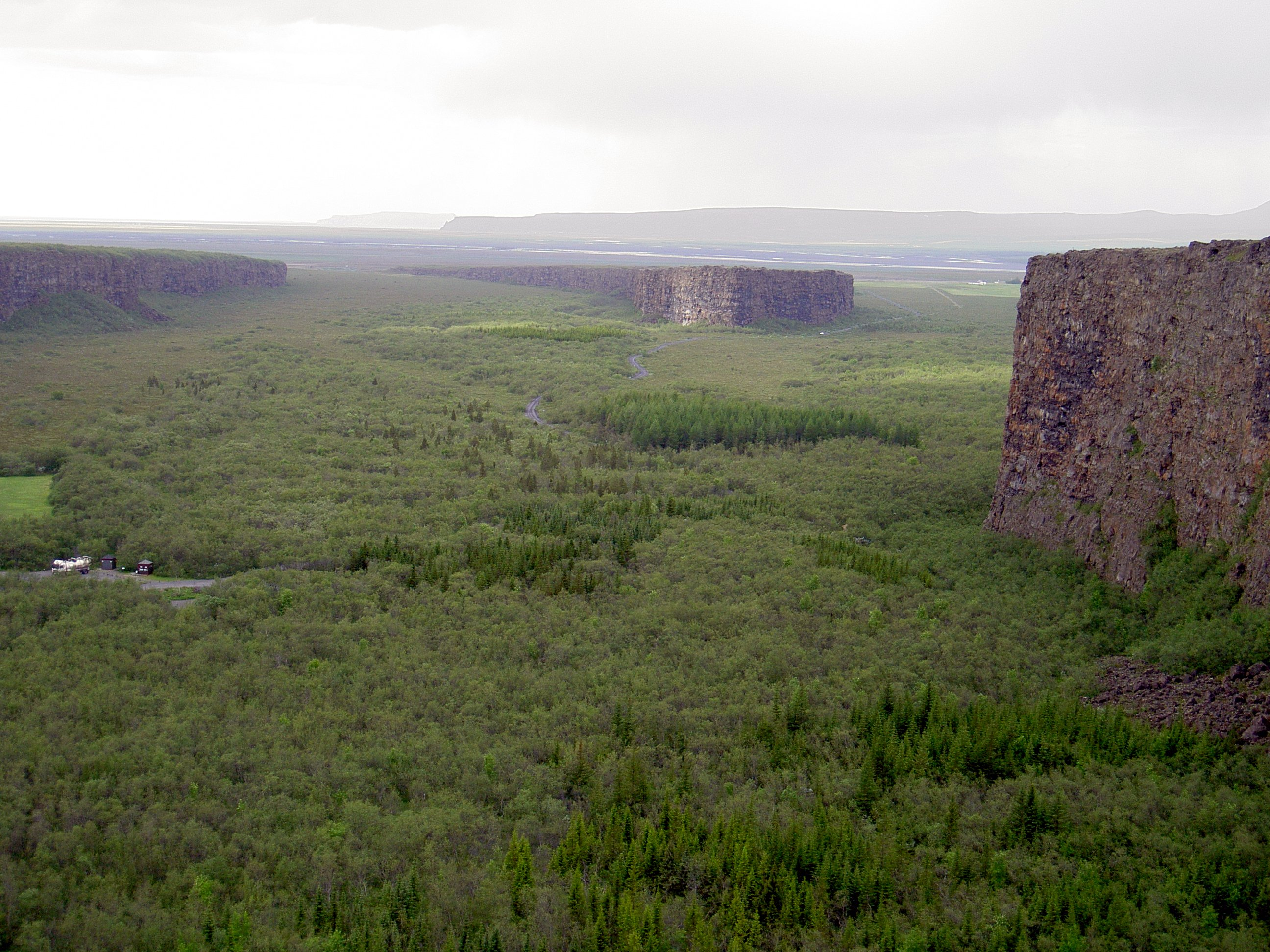
The horseshoe-shaped canyon Ásbyrgi.

According to Icelandic folklore, the horseshoe-shaped canyon Ásbyrgi located in Jökulsárgljúfur National Park, northern Iceland was formed by Sleipnir's hoof. Sleipnir is depicted with Odin on Dagfin Werenskiold's wooden relief Odin på Sleipnir (1945–1950) on the exterior of the Oslo City Hall in Oslo, Norway. Sleipnir has been and remains a popular name for ships in northern Europe, and Rudyard Kipling's short story entitled Sleipner, late Thurinda (1888) features a horse named Sleipner. A statue of Sleipnir (1998) stands in Wednesbury, England, a town which takes its name from the Anglo-Saxon version of Odin, Wōden.

== See also ==
- List of horses in mythology and folklore
  - Arion (horse)
  - Pegasus, the winged horse of Greek mythology
- Helhest, the three-legged "Hel horse" of later Scandinavian folklore
- Horses in Germanic paganism
- The "táltos steed", a six-legged horse in Hungarian folklore
- Sinterklaas's white stallion, on which he rides along the roofs in winter
- The horse in Nordic mythology
