= Gulltoppr =

Horse in Norse mythology

In Norse mythology, Gulltoppr (Old Norse: [ˈɡulːˌtopːz̠], "golden mane") is one of the horses of the gods. Gulltoppr is mentioned in a list of horses in the Poetic Edda poem Grímnismál and in Nafnaþulur section of the Prose Edda. According to Prose Edda book Gylfaginning, he is the horse of Heimdallr. Rudolf Simek theorizes that Snorri assigned a horse to Heimdall in an attempt to systematize the mythology.

== See also ==
- Horses in Germanic paganism
- List of horses in mythology and folklore
