= Falhófnir =

Horse of the gods in Norse mythology

In Norse mythology, Falhófnir (Old Norse: [ˈfɑlˌhoːvnez̠]) is a horse listed in both Grímnismál and Gylfaginning among the steeds ridden by the gods each day when they go to make judgements at Yggdrasil. However, in both stanzas Falhófnir is not assigned to any specific deity.

== See also ==
- Horses in Germanic paganism
- List of horses in mythology and folklore
