= Grani =

Horse owned by the hero Sigurd

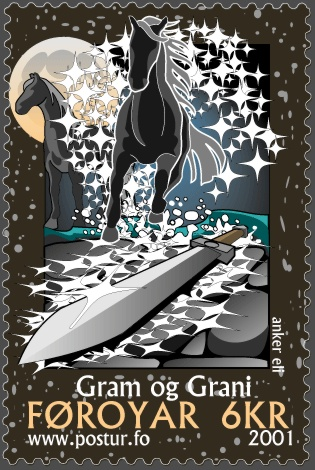
Grani and the sword Gram, 2001 Faroese stamp

In Scandinavian heroic legend, Grani (Old Norse: [ˈɡrɑne]) is a horse owned by the hero Sigurd. He is the horse that Sigurd receives through advice from Odin. Grani is a descendant of Odin's own steed, Sleipnir.

== Attestations ==
In chapter 13 of Völsunga saga, the hero Sigurðr is on his way to a wood when he meets a long-bearded old man he had never seen before. Sigurd tells the old man that he is going to choose a horse, and asks the old man to come with him to help him decide. The old man says that they should drive the horses down to the river Busiltjörn. The two drive the horses down into the deeps of Busiltjörn, and all of the horses swim back to land but a large, young, and handsome gray horse that no one had ever mounted. The grey-bearded old man says that the horse is from "Sleipnir's kin" and that "he must be nourished heedfully, for it will be the best of all horses". The old man vanishes. Sigurd names the horse Grani, and the narrative adds that the old man was none other than Odin.

== Archeological evidence ==
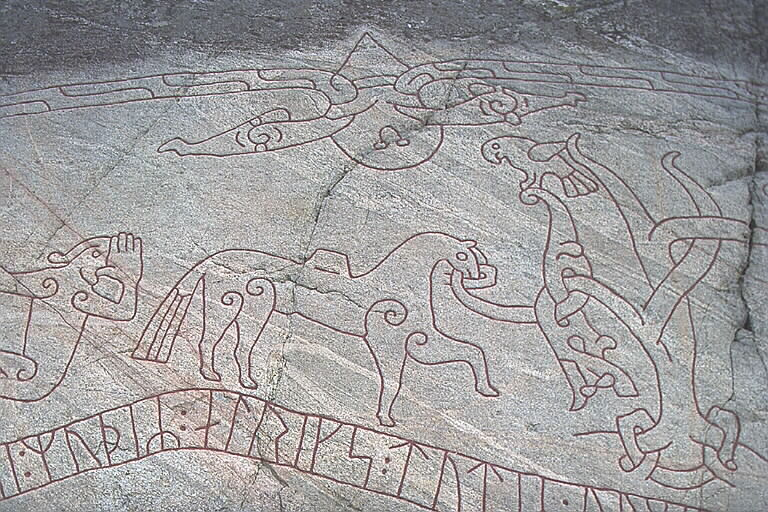
Grani on the Ramsund carving

Grani is believed to be depicted on several of the Sigurd stones, which depict imagery from the legend of Sigurd the dragon slayer, including the inscription on Sö 327 in Gök, Södermanland County, Sweden. In Norse iconography, the depiction of a horse carrying a chest was sufficient to represent Grani carrying the treasure after Sigurd had slain the dragon Fafnir. This is supported by a kenning in a Norse poem that refers to "Grani's beauteous burden," indicating a common understanding of the motif.

== Modern influence ==
In Wagner's Ring cycle of operas the name (as "Grane") is given to Brünnhilde's horse.

In Henrik Ibsen's play Peer Gynt, Peer rides an imaginary sled drawn by a horse called "Grane" to soothe his mother Aase on her deathbed, claiming they are going to meet St. Peter.

In Digimon Tamers, Grani was the name of the refitted 'Ark', which was used as a steed by Gallantmon late in the series. It was directly stated in episode 47 that it was named by its creators after Siegfried's horse, Grani. Grani would later be used to upgrade Gallantmon into his Crimson Mode during the finale of the series and in one of the theatrical movies. Grani also forms the theoretical Old Norse root of the etymology of the island of Guernsey via Anglo-Norman, from "Granis" (Grani's) + "ey" (dialectical term for "little island"); although it is probable that this was from a Viking's personal name rather than a direct appellation to the divine horse.

In Fire Emblem Heroes, Grani's Shield is a skill that protects cavalry units against bonus damage from enemies who have anti-cavalry weapons.

In Final Fantasy XIV, Grani is a mount available to players that pre-ordered the Shadowbringers expansion. It is described in-game as a "heroic steed from a realm not your own."

In Arknights, Grani is a character based on a horse-inspired race.

In Granblue Fantasy, Grani can be fought as a raid boss and be obtained as a summon.

== See also ==
- List of horses in mythology and folklore
