= Gullfaxi =

Norse mythical horse

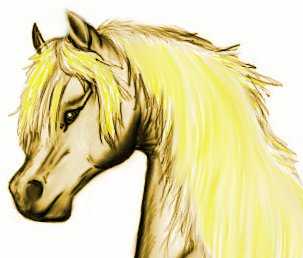
An artist's impression of Gullfaxi

Gullfaxi (Old Norse: [ˈɡulːˌfɑkse]) is a horse in Norse mythology. Its name means "golden mane".

It was originally owned by Hrungnir, and was later given to Magni by Thor as a reward for lifting off the leg of Hrungnir, which lay over the unconscious Thor and strangled him:

'And I will give thee,' he said, 'the horse Gold-Mane, which Hrungnir possessed.'

Then Odin spake and said that Thor did wrong to give the good horse to the son of a giantess, and not to his father.

—Skáldskaparmál (17)

Gullfaxi is equally fast on land, in the air and on the water, but not quite as fast as Sleipnir, Odin's horse.

== Folk tale ==
Gullfaxi is also the name of a horse in the modern Icelandic folk-tale The Horse Gullfaxi and the Sword Gunnfoder collected by Jón Árnason, translated into German by Josef Poestion, then rendered into English and included in the Crimson Fairy Book (1903) compiled by Andrew Lang.

== See also ==
- Guldfaxe (glacier)
- List of horses in mythology and folklore
