= Hrungnir =

Norse mythical character

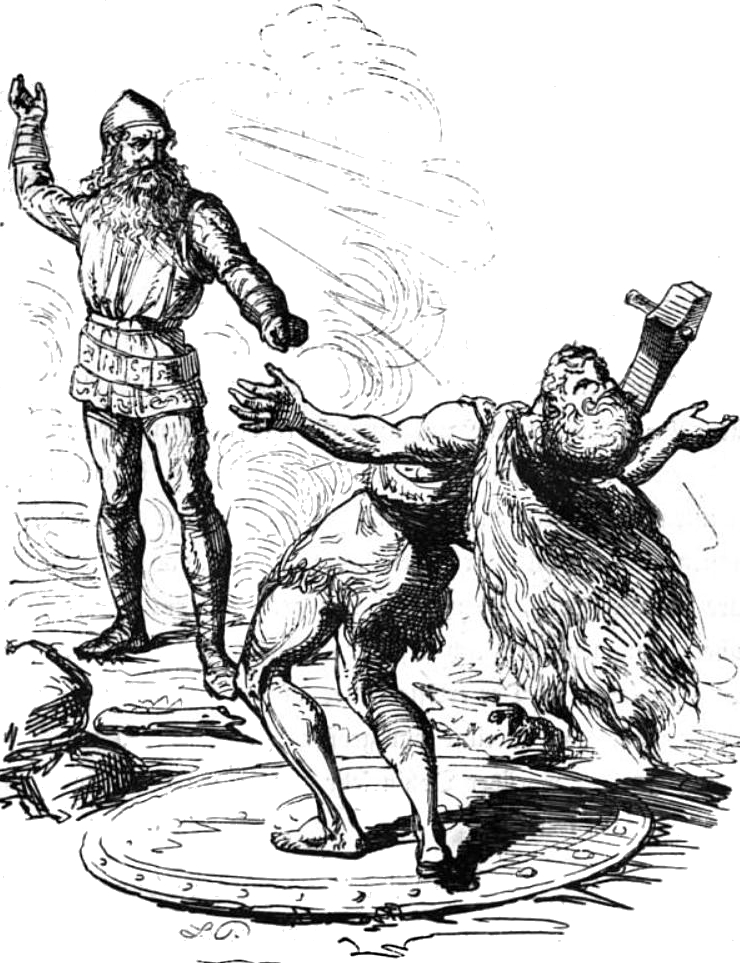
Thor slays Hrungnir, illustration by Ludwig Pietsch (1865)

Hrungnir (Old Norse: [ˈhruŋɡnɪɹ], 'brawler') is a jötunn in Norse mythology. He is described as made of stone and is ultimately killed in a duel with the thunder god Thor.

Prior to his demise, Hrungnir engaged in a wager with Odin in which Odin stakes his head on his horse, Sleipnir, being faster than Hrungnir's steed Gullfaxi. During the race, which Sleipnir wins, Hrungnir enters Ásgard, and there becomes drunk and abusive. After they grow weary of him, the gods call on the god Thor to battle Hrungnir. He is slain by Thor's hammer Mjölnir.

Hrungnir is comparable to the Hurrian Ullikummi, a stone-giant who grew so quickly that he reached the heavens. He was slain by the thunder-god Teshub who is equivalent also to the Luwian Tarḫunz and Hittite Tarḫunna.

== Name ==
The Old Norse name Hrungnir has been translated as 'brawler', or as 'big person, strong man', 'noise-maker'.

== Attestations ==
=== Prose Edda ===
In Skáldskaparmál (The Language of Poetry), written in the 13th century CE by Snorri Sturluson, the god Odin is portrayed as riding his horse Sleipnir into Jötunheim when he meets the jötunn Hrungnir, mounted on his horse Gullfaxi (Gold-mane). They have a short verbal exchange about the quality of their respective horse, during which Odin states his willingness to bet his head (his life) on the result. Hrungnir declares that he has "a horse that must be much longe-paced, it [is] called Gullfaxi." Then Hrungnir gets angry, leaps upon his horse and follows Odin in a race towards Ásgard, "intending to pay him back for his boasting". Although Sleipnir turns out to be the fastest horse, the race is very close and Odin is not able to keep Hrungnir out of the place of gods, Ásgard. There, the Æsir (gods) invites Hrungnir for a drink.

Hrungnir becomes so intoxicated that he threatens to remove "Val-hall and take it to Giantland" and to "bury Asgard and kill all the gods", besides the beautiful goddesses Freyja and Sif whom he intends to keep for himself. The gods then call the thunder-god Thor to expel the unwanted guest, and the two of them agree to a duel. Thor arrives at the appointment with his servant Þjálfi, and Hrungnir is escorted by Mokkurkálfi ('Mist-calf'), a mighty creature made of clay, and with the heart of a mare. But the giant Mokkurkálfi is said to be "quite terrified" and he "wets himself" at the sight of Thor, whereas Hrungnir, whose heart, head and shield appear to be made of stone, is "standing unguardedly". After the fight is over and Hrungnir eventually defeated, Thor turns out to be stuck under the jötunn's leg. Thor's three-year-old son Magni is the only one able to lift up the gigantic leg among all the present Æsir (gods). As a reward, Thor offers him Hrungnir's horse Gullfaxi.

Then he saw Thor in an As-rage, he was travelling at an enormous rate and swung his hammer and threw it from a great distance at Hrungnir. Hrungnir raised the whet stone with both hands, threw it in return. It met the hammer in flight, the whetstone, and the whetstone broke in two. One piece fell to the ground, and from it have come all whetstone rocks. The other piece crashed into Thor’s head so that he fell forwards to the ground, but the hammer Miollnir hit the middle of Hrungnir’s head and shattered his skull into small fragments, and he fell forwards over Thor so that his leg lay across Thor’s neck. Thialfi attacked Mokkurkalfi, and he fell with little glory.

— Skáldskaparmál, 17, trans. A. Faulkes, 1987.

=== Skaldic poetry ===
Haustlöng (Autumn-long, 14–20), a poem written by the early 10th-century skald Þjóðólfr of Hvinir and from which Snorri claims to derive his own account, depicts Thor's journey to the duel while the cosmological elements are reacting: the "ground all low" (earth) is "battered with hail" and "all the hawk's sanctuaries" (the skies) are in flame; "Svolnir’s widow" (Odin's consort, Jörð [Earth]) practically split apart". Then Hrungnir and Thor fight by hurling their weapons at each other (the jötunn's whetstone and Thor's hammer), and the poem alludes to the removal of the piece of whetstone from Thor's head.

Baldr’s brother [Thor] did not spare there the greedy enemy of men [Hrungnir], Mountains shook and rocks smashed; heaven above burned. I have heard that the watcher [Hrungnir] of the dark bone [rock] of the land [sea] of Haki’s carriages [ships] moved violently in opposition when he saw his warlike slayer.

Swiftly flew the pale ring-ice [shield] beneath the soles of the rock-guarder [giant]. The bonds [gods] caused this, the ladies of the fray [valkyries] wished it. The rock-gentleman [giant] did not have to wait long after that for a swift blow from the tough multitude-smashing friend [Thor] of hammer-face-troll [Miollnir].

— Þjóðólfr of Hvinir, Haustlöng, 16–17 [Skáld 17], trans. A. Faulkes, 1987.

Compared to Snorri's account, Þjóðólfr emphasizes more on Thor's journey to the battle, escorted by noise and flames, while Snorri makes relatively little of it and also describes Hrungnir's journey. Thor's servant Þjálfi and Hrungnir's clay-made giant Mokkurkálfi are absent from Þjóðólfr’s 10th-century version.

In Ragnarsdrápa, the 9th-century skald Bragi Boddason mentions "Hrungnir's skull-splitter".

And the ugly ring [serpent] of the side-oared ship’s road [sea] stared up spitefully at Hrungnir’s skull-splitter

— Bragi Boddason, Ragnarsdrápa, Skáld 4, trans. A. Faulkes, 1987.

Bragi also refers to the shield as "Hrungnir's sole-blade" and refers to Hrungnir as the "thief of Þrúðr", the daughter of Thor.

Will you hear, Hrafnketil, how I shall praise the sole-blade of the thief of Thrud [Hrungnir], which has fine colour planted on it, and the prince?

— Bragi Boddason, Ragnarsdrápa, Skáld 49, trans. A. Faulkes, 1987.

== Theories ==
According to scholar John Lindow, the reaction of cosmological elements (the earth is cracking, the sky burning) during Thor's journey to the battle, as told in Haustlöng, "suggests the cosmic nature of Thor’s duel with Hrungnir". The motivation for the duel, which is not mentioned by 10th-century skald Þjóðólfr in Haustlöng, could have originally been the abduction of Thor's daughter Þrúðr by the stone-made giant Hrungnir, as suggested by an earlier kenning by 9th-century skald Bragi: 'leaf of the soles of the thief of Þrúðr [SHIELD]' (blað ilja Þrúðar þjófs).

Georges Dumézil argues that the story involves the initiation of Þjálfi by Thor in the killing of the clay-made monster.

== See also ==
- Conchobar mac Nessa, an Irish king from the Ulster Cycle, who is wounded in a very similar manner by Cet mac Magach
