= Horses in Germanic paganism =

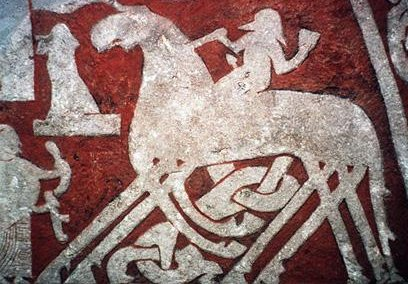
Odin and Sleipnir depicted on a monument from about the 9th century in Gotland

There was a significant importance for horses in Germanic paganism, with them being venerated in a continuous tradition among the Germanic peoples from the Nordic Bronze Age until their Christianisation. They featured in a number of diverse and interrelated religious practices, being one of the most common animals sacrificed in blóts and found in graves, notably in examples such as at Sutton Hoo and the Oseberg ship. During the establishment of the church in Northern Europe, horsemeat shifted from being holy to taboo, with the eating of it being made a punishable offence and a recurring identifier of "savages" in saga literature.

The role of horses in religious practice is mirrored in extant Germanic mythology and legend, with the actions of both heroes and gods reflecting historical and archaeological records. Beyond this, horses further have a central role in mythical and legendary narratives frequently carrying their rider between worlds and through the air.

== Origins and background ==
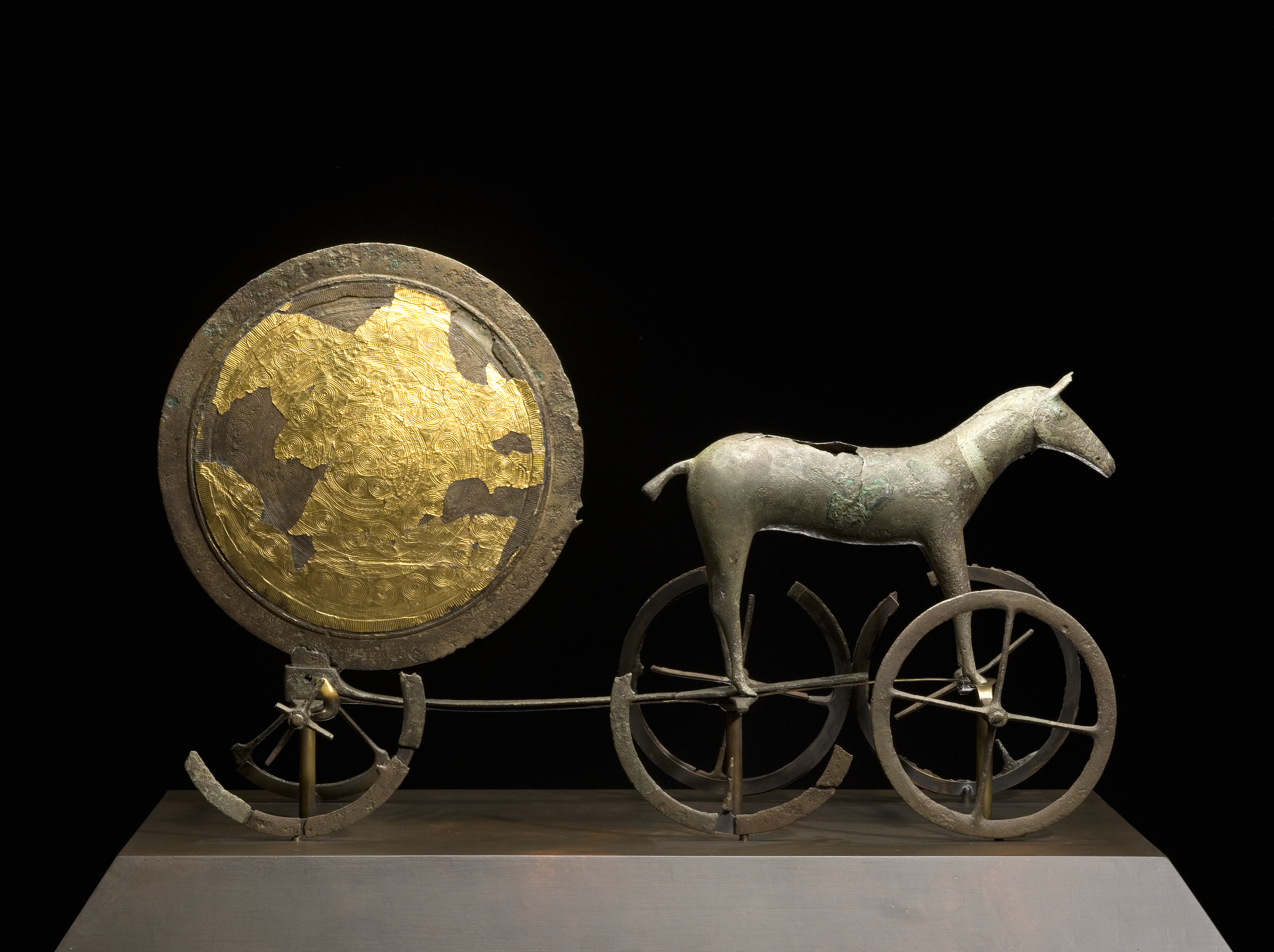
The gilded side of the Trundholm sun chariot

The importance of horses in the mythology and symbolism of the Germanic peoples dates back at least to the Nordic Bronze Age and shows continuity up until their Christianisation, likely stemming from aspects such as their practical importance, and inherited traditions from their Indo-European ancestors. Horses are depicted throughout the Bronze Age, in art such as rock carvings and on holy razor blades. The Trundholm Sun Chariot for example, dating to around 1400 BCE, consists of a horse pulling a wagon upon which sits a model of the sun and was found in a bog in Denmark.

== Mythology and legend ==
Hengist and Horsa, often translated as "Stallion" and "Horse", are two brothers mentioned by Bede as leaders of Germanic peoples during the Anglo-Saxon settlement of Britain. The brothers are described as descendants of Woden, with Hengist becoming listed as the ancestor of the Kentish royal dynasty. Scholars have suggested a connection between the two figures and other venerated twins in Indo-European cultures such as Pollux and Castor, and Romulus and Remus. It has been further suggested that the two figures were linked to a horse cult and are depicted in Anglo-Saxon art such as pressblech foils and brooches.

A number of horses feature in Nordic mythology, both throughout tales and in lists such as those in the poem Kálfsvísa and the þulur. These include the horses of the Æsir, ridden by gods such as Odin and Freyr, Skinfaxi and Hrímfaxi, the horses that pull Day and Night respectively, and Grani, the horse of Sigurð Fáfnir's bane. Unnamed horses are also ridden by valkyries, often allowing them to fly, consistent with a widespread motif of particular horses allowing the rider to travel between worlds, seen in accounts such as Skírnismál. It has been further noted that the name of the world tree, Yggdrasill translates to "Ygg's (Odin's) steed", making the horse symbolism central to the understanding of the cosmos. Odin is also presented in a verse by Þórðr Sjáreksson recorded in Skáldskaparmál as a tamer of horses. This aristocratic status is similarly seen in Rígsþula, in which the children of Jarl tame horses.

== Dedication to gods ==
Prior to the establishment of Christianity, Frey was closely associated with the horse cult, with multiple accounts attesting holy horses being dedicated to him. Óláfs saga Tryggvasonar describes how holy horses were kept at a hof in Thrandheim. When the saga's namesake journeyed there to destroy the site, he finds one of the stallions about to be killed for Frey to eat. He then mounts the horse and rides it to the hof, before dragging Frey out of the building. In Hrafnkels saga Freysgoða, the eponymous goði was a friend of Frey and shared half his possessions with the god, including twelve mares and a stallion named Freyfaxi. The stallion was held in special regard and Hrafnkell allowed none but himself to ride him. Later in the tale, a boy rides Freyfaxi and so is killed by Hrafnkell, resulting in the figure abandoning Frey and Hrafnkell's enemies killing Freyfaxi by throwing him off a cliff. The name "Freyfaxi" is also seen in Vatnsdæla saga, suggesting its dedication to Frey in a similar manner. Elsewhere in this tale, the sons of Ingimund, who worship Frey, attend horse fights, which have been argued to have originated in the cult of Frey.

Though it is not explicitly mentioned, it has been proposed that the riding of one of Frey's horses by Olaf Tryggvason was an intentional transgression of the forbidding of riding the holy horses, such as that seen in Hrafnkels saga Freysgoða. A similar prohibition is seen in Bede's account of the Anglo-Saxon heathen priest Coifi, who was not permitted to ride, except on mares, or bear arms while pagan, but during his conversion rode to the temple on a stallion, with a spear and declared the renunciation of his earlier faith. Notably in this account, as with Hrafnkels saga Freysgoða, riding of mares is explicitly permitted, while that of stallions is not. It has been proposed that both narratives are based on a shared cultural motif.

== In funeral and burial ==
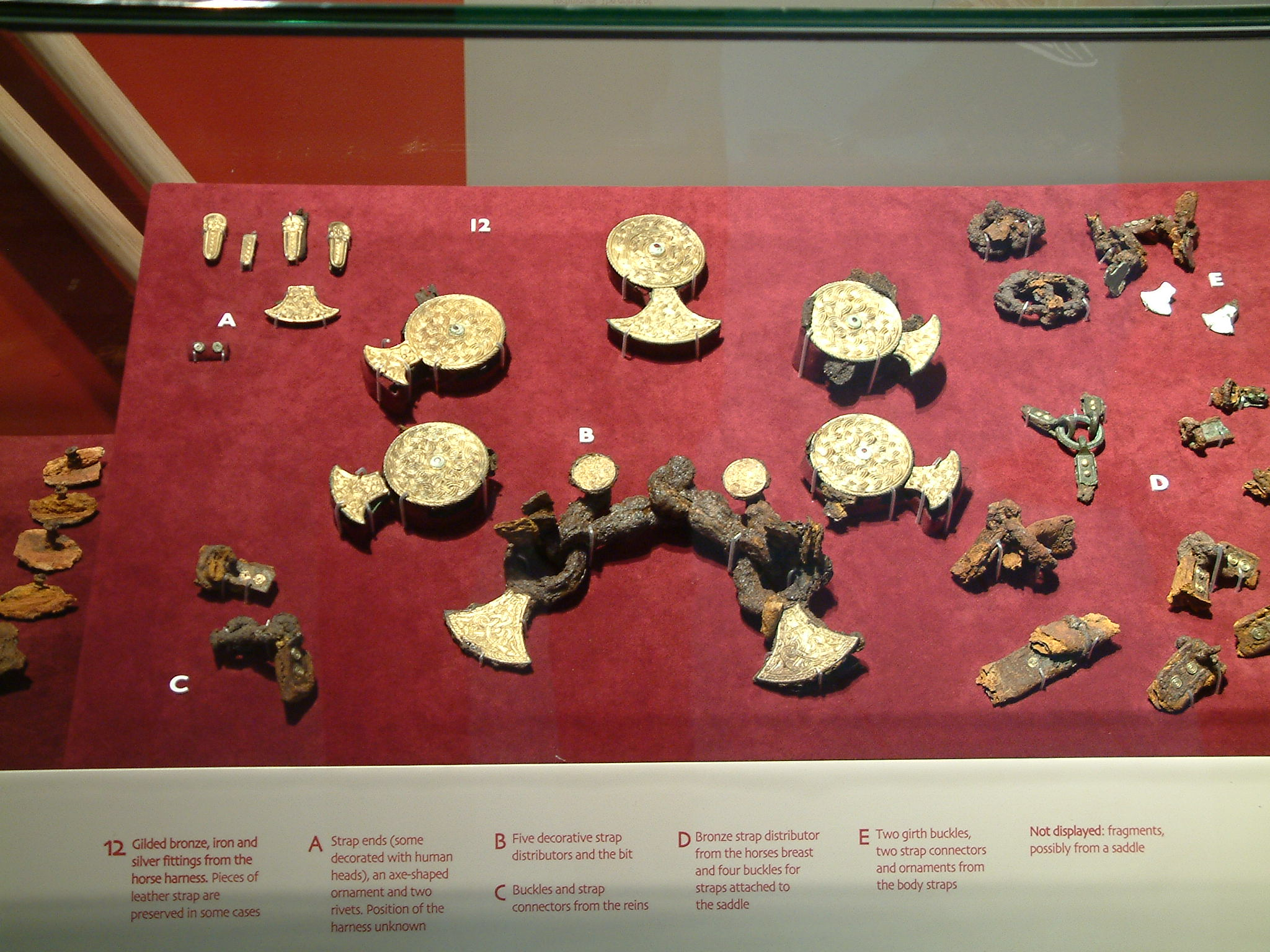
Remains of the horse burial in Mound 17, Sutton Hoo

Horse burial was practised in Scandinavia during the Late Roman Iron Age, consistent with Tacitus' account of it taking place among the Germanic Rhineland tribes in the 1st century CE. The practice is also well attested from the 5th to 7th centuries CE among continental Germanic peoples such as the Alamanni, Bavarians, Lombards, Franks, Saxons and Thuringians, including at the funeral of the Frankish king Childeric I. It has been suggested that the increase in horse burial at the start of the 5th century was through influence from the Huns, though the practice was taking place previously.

No extant textual sources describe efforts by the Church to suppress animal burial, however, in all regions, increasing Christian cultural influence from the 5th to 11th centuries correlated with the gradual decline in horse burials. Typically, practices altered slowly with periods of syncretism. For example, the Alemanni were officially Christianised in the late 6th century, however, horses continued to be buried with people into the second half of the 7th century, often alongside gold-foil crosses.

Similar to in continental contexts, horse burial in Anglo-Saxon England seems to have been strongly associated with heathen elite male identity, however, the inclusion of horses in human cremations was common, suggesting it was not restricted to those of high status. When buried, the horses were typically either still wearing their harnesses or were placed next to them. Horse burials seemed to have ceased in Anglo-Saxon England over the course of the 7th century, when Christianity became established as the dominant faith, but was briefly revived in the 9th and 10th centuries due to influence from North-Germanic peoples.

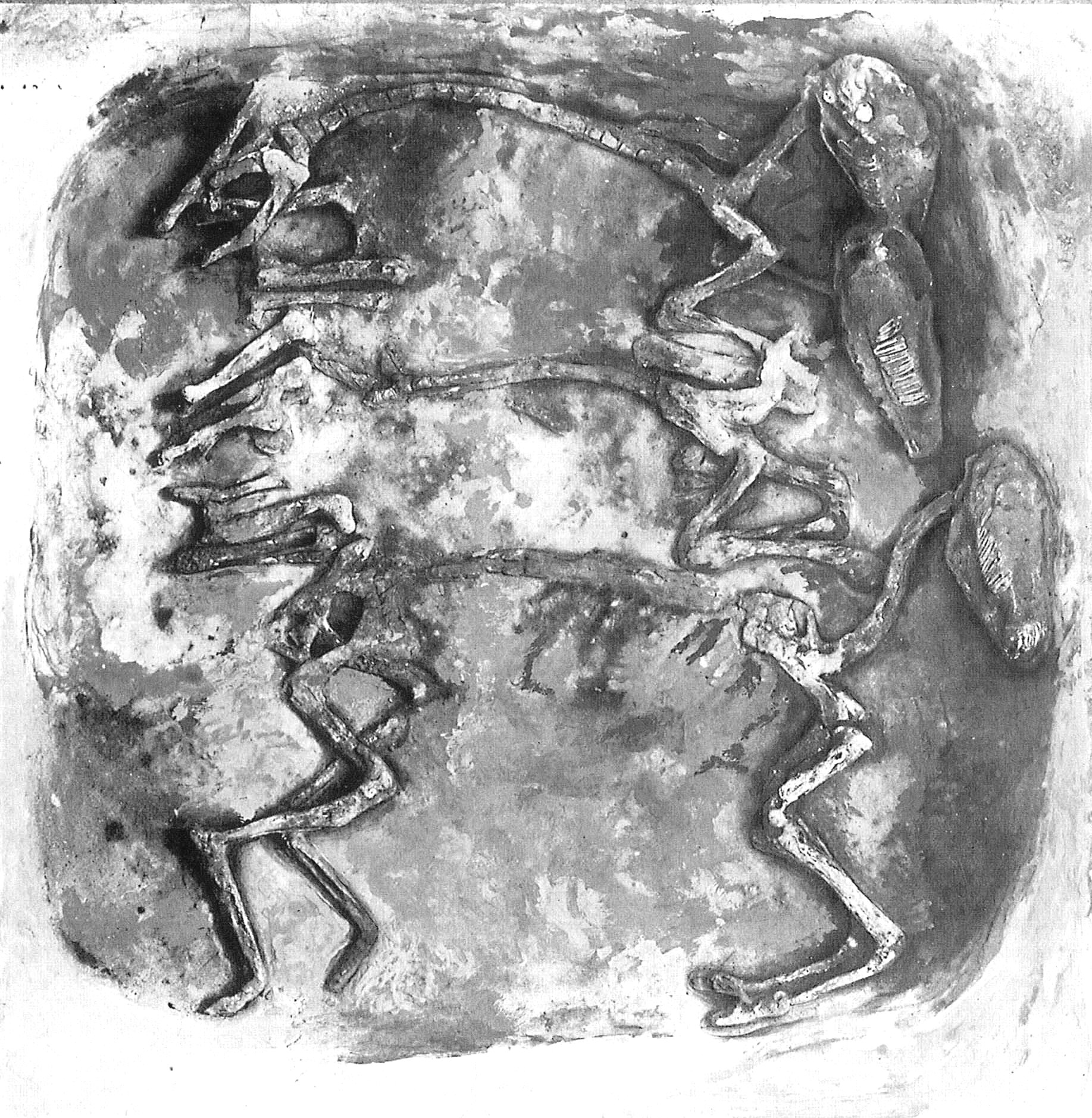
The Wulfsen horse burial shown in situ

In the Viking Age in Scandinavia, horses are found in both male and female, inhumation and cremation burials, and ship burials such as that at Oseberg and Valsgärde. In Oseberg, at least 10 horses were found, all of which were old at the time of death, potentially to reduce the cost of the burial, though it has also been suggested that they had a special relation to the deceased. In Scandinavian horse burials, there is a wide variety in how the animal was killed and deposited, being in both flat-ground and mound burials, and the horses being combinations of beheaded, intact, in standing positions, laying down and placed on a buried ship. North Germanic horse burials are also described in accounts such as Egils saga when Skalla-Grim is buried along with his weapons, tools and horse. Horses are also related to the dead in cases such as Helgi in Helgakviða Hundingsbana II when he leaves the land of the living on horseback, and the valkyrjur riding on horses when they collect the dead. Furthermore, they are seen in the mythic material such as the account of Baldr's funeral in Gylfaginning.

A horse-ship funeral among the Rus' is described by Ahmad ibn Fadlan in which two horses are made to run until they sweated before being killed, cut up and put on a ship that had been drawn out of the water, upon which the dead chieftain lay. In addition to the horses, a dog and two cows were killed and placed on the ship alongside other goods such as beer and bread. The ship was then set on fire and, once burnt out, a mound was erected upon it and a pole placed on it bearing the name of the dead chieftain and his king.

The reason for including horses in burials is unclear however scholars have suggested various interpretations including that they were intended to appease the gods, to accompany the dead to the afterlife, or that it was solely to show economic strength. Horses in particular may have been made appealing for a burial role due to their ability to travel long distances and their noble associations.

== Blót and horsemeat ==
=== England ===
==== Heathen period ====
Archaeological evidence suggests that horsemeat was consistently, but rarely, eaten by humans throughout the Anglo-Saxon period in England, at a rate similar to that prior to the Anglo-Saxon migration in Britain. It has been proposed that this infrequency could have increased the significance of the act, further reinforced by the importance of horses in Germanic paganism.

In Anglo-Saxon England, horse sacrifice was not restricted to social elites however the extent of class dependence is difficult to assess during the Early Anglo-Saxon period due to the unclear distinction between high and low-status settlements prior to around the start of the 7th century. Horse burials and eating of the meat may have been interrelated practices in this period, similar to in Scandinavian communities, with examples in which only the head is placed in the grave potentially corresponding to cases in which the body was eaten. Several examples of remains believed to result from short periods of feasting have been discovered dating to the end of the Early period and into the Mid period such as near Yarnton in which horse jawbones were uncovered, but no meat-bearing bones.

Finds such as the 6th-7th century site at Melton in Yorkshire and Cresswell Field in Oxfordshire show close association between feasting on horses and religious practice, such as the deposition at the edge of a lake and proximity to possible cultic structures. The site at Melton also shows horse heads and hoofs, which may have resulted from the remains being displayed as skins with both the head and hoofs still attached prior to deposition. Rituals involving heads and hooves trace back to the Bronze Age and notably also took place in southern and eastern Scandinavia in the Roman Iron Age, continuing into the Migration Period.

==== Christian period ====
From the end of the 6th century CE onwards, missionaries began trying to Christianise the heathen Anglo-Saxons, with the last kings converting during the Mid Anglo-Saxon period. Over this period there is a significant decline in sites found with evidence of eating horse, and those that are typically of lower status. Two not mutually exclusive explanations proposed are that horsemeat could have been eaten in times of famine and that poorer people are more likely to face food shortages, and that lower status people retained the religious significance of eating horse for longer. Some elite sites do show continued consumption of horsemeat took place nonetheless, such as at Flixborough in Lincolnshire. A major reason for the decline has been proposed to be the increased desire by Christian officials from the 8th century CE onwards to construct an orthodoxy in the region, standardising religious practice and choosing to incorporate some aspects of culture originating in heathenry, while eradicating others that were deemed incompatible with the stance of the church, including consumption of horse meat. This is consistent with similar processes in Ireland, in which horses were eaten both during and after Christianisation of the elite, being tolerated until the 8th century when efforts started being made to suppress it.

Theodore in his 7th century Penitential writes about the English that 'They do not prohibit horse, yet it is not their custom to eat it'. Notably, he also did not prohibit it, however this has been suggested to be because the text was written it was less than a hundred years since the first missions began to convert the Anglo-Saxons and his stance was taken as a form of political accommodation of the practice. Around 732 CE, responding to a question from Boniface about the eating of horsemeat by the Thuringians, Pope Gregory III condemned it as a 'filthy and abominable practice' to be suppressed 'in every possible way'. It has been proposed that as Boniface was from Wessex, his need to ask about the practice could reflect an increased suppression effort in England. In 786 CE, the Papal Legates stated during a visit to England that 'many of you eat horses, which no Christian does in the East. Avoid this also...', contrasting with Theodore's account. It has been argued that the more permissive views of church officials in the 7th century shifted towards a more hard-line effort towards active suppression by the end of the 8th century.

Horsemeat eating continued to decline into the Late Anglo-Saxon period, with most archaeological evidence being found in urban centres, and the majority of sites being located in areas with largest Scandinavian settlement such as York.

=== Scandinavia ===
==== Heathen period ====
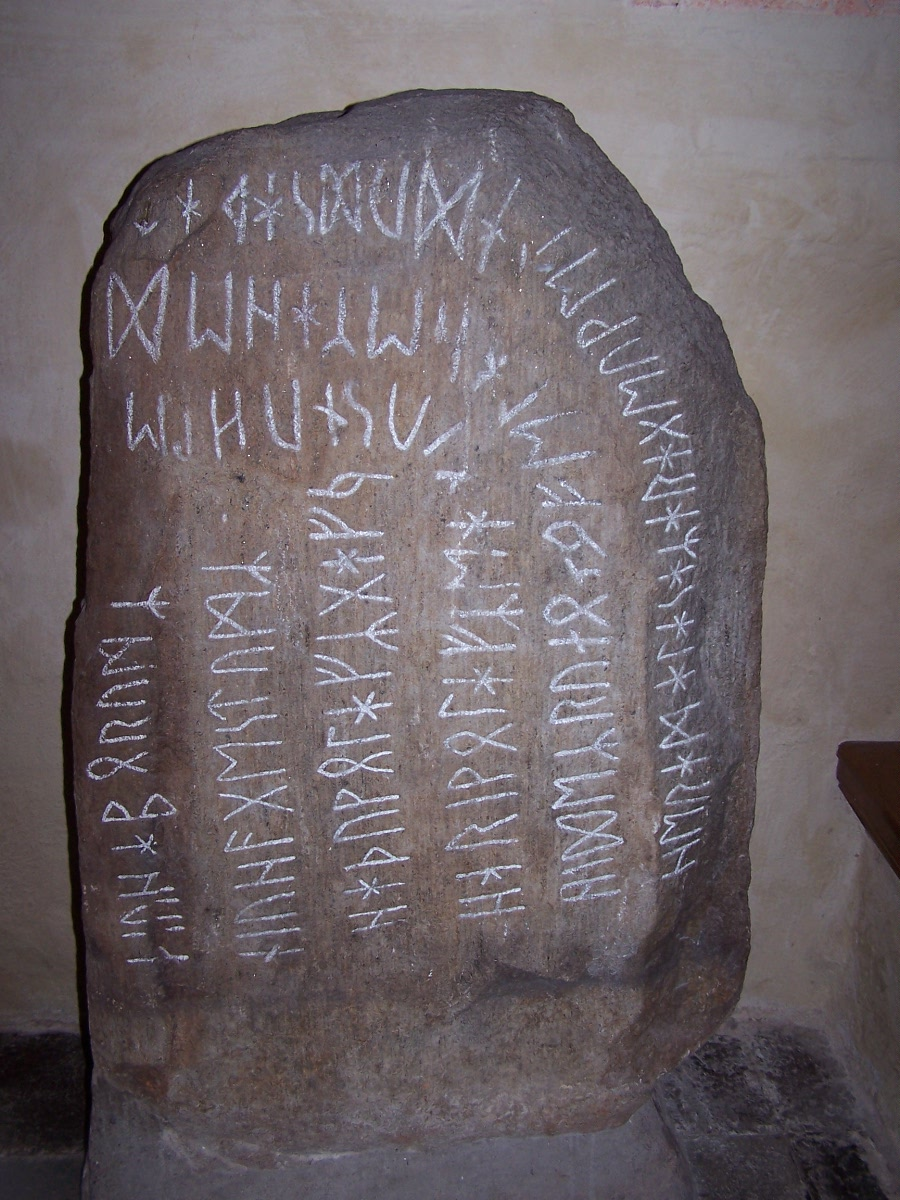
The Stentoften Stone, bearing a runic inscription that likely describes a blót of nine he-goats and nine male horses bringing fertility to the land.

Horses are one of the most common animals described as being sacrificed in blót, second only to cattle, being listed in notable accounts such as those of Adam of Bremen, Thietmar of Merseburg and the Stentoften Runestone. Remains of eaten horses have been found at the wetland Skedemosse in Öland dating to the Roman Iron Age.

One of the most detailed descriptions of their role in Old Nordic ritual practice is found in the saga of Hákon the Good in Heimskringla. Here, the text describes how, prior to the establishment of the Church in Norway, an old custom was observed in the area around Trondheim in which people sacrificed horses and cattle in blót at a hof that stood there. The blood, referred to as hlaut, was collected and sprinkled over the walls of the hof, while the meat was cooked on a fire in the hof and eaten by the attendees of the blót. According to the account, Hákon, who had converted to Christianity, would usually eat in a small building away from the feast, however, due to discontent among the attendees, he agreed to participate in a blót feast at Lade. There, he first refused to eat the horse meat, then to drink the soup made from it, and finally to just taste the soup. Hákon's earl, Sigurð, brokered peace between the king and his subjects by convincing the king to hold his mouth open over the handle of the kettle where fat from the boiled meat had settled, though it notes that neither side was happy with this. Later on at a Yule feast in More, he ate horse-liver, to his displeasure, by request of Earl Sigurð. This has been interpreted as resulting from Hákon's perception of horsemeat as embodying heathenry and being a contaminating substance when eaten. Conversely, its eating was likely seen as a deeply political act, showing social recognition of the subjects by the king if performed.

Of 104 animal bone depositions from 53 sites in continental Scandinavia and Iceland dating to the Merovingian period or Viking Age, 52% contained horse remains, however, the number containing pigs, cattle, and sheep or goats is very similar. (Note: In this study, sheep and goats could not always be told apart with confidence, due to the highly similar morphology, and were included as a single category.) It was further noted both regional and temporal variations are seen, with the percentage of depositions including horse remains being higher in the Viking Age than in the Merovingian Period. Horse depositions were found to be the most common animal in wetland sites and wells, potentially in cultural continuity with the Germanic Iron Age when the practice was common, while they are infrequent compared to other animals at cult-houses and open-air sites interpreted as hörgar. With almost all the deposited finds, the animal seems to have been subsequently cooked and eaten. Based on this, and written sources, it has been proposed that eating the sacrificed animal typically constituted an important part of the blót. It has been noted that it is difficult to distinguish ritual and ordinary consumption, although the existence of this distinction has also been questioned, given that meat would likely have only been eaten by most people at certain times of year and that potentially all meat was seen as sacred, providing sustenance and reflecting the holiness of the animals it came from. Some examples do exist, however, in which parts of the horse are buried without being eaten, such as at the sacrificial wells in Trelleborg, in which the hind limb was deposited. Horse bones dating to the Viking Age have been further found in Dublin showing signs of butchery and marrow extraction.

While literary sources suggest a preferential use of stallions over mares in blót, this has yet to be confirmed archaeologically due to the low sample size. (Note: In the study, 5 out of 8 horses whose sex was identified were male.)

==== Christian period ====
Islendingabók and Kristni saga list eating of horsemeat along with other explicitly heathen practices that were decided to be permitted in secret for a short time, before being fully made illegal, after the decision at the Althing in 1000 CE that Icelanders should all become Christian:

Old Norse text

Þá var þat mælt í lögum, at allir menn skyldi kristnir vera ok skírn taka, þeir er áðr váru óskírðir á landi hér. En of barnaútburð skyldu standa in fornu lög ok of hrossakjötsát. Skyldu menn blóta á laun, ef vildu en varða fjörbaugsgarðr, er váttum of kæmi við. En síðar fám vetrum var sú heiðni af numin sem önnur.

Grønlie translation

It was then proclaimed in the laws that all people should be Christian, and that those in this country who had not yet been baptised should receive baptism; but the old laws should stand as regards the exposure of children and the eating of horse-flesh. People had the right to sacrifice in secret, if they wished, but it would be punishable by the lesser outlawry if witnesses were produced. And a few years later, these heathen provisions were abolished, like the others.

Njáls saga gives a very similar account of how it was proclaimed that all Icelanders would have to be Christian by law, along with the prohibition of public blót, exposing of children and eating of horsemeat. As in Íslendingabók and Kristni saga, the right to perform these acts secretly was removed after several years, making them illegal. This is consistent with the Grágás and Gulathing law codes from Iceland and Norway respectively that specifically list eating of horsemeat as an offence punishable by confiscation of property and outlawry, making it the most strictly prohibited food in Scandinavia after the Christianisation. Furthermore, as with pigs that have eaten human flesh, the Grágás forbid the eating of pigs that have eaten horsemeat without the pig first going through a specified process of fasting, to remove its edible meat, before fattening it again. It is not explicit why the practice of eating horsemeat was banned, with it being noted that while it may have been due to the association with heathen traditions, the ban was not specific to Scandinavia. It has been suggested, however, that associating horse meat and the feeling of disgust, as seen in the account in Hákon the Good, formed part of a wider effort by the church authorities to promote their ideas of morality and enforce a stricter religious orthodoxy.

Eating of horsemeat is demonised in some sagas, such as Hálfdanar saga Brönufóstra, Bárðar saga Snæfellsáss and Sörla saga sterka, in which it is often eaten by jötnar and trolls, along with the flesh of humans. In these tales, those eating horse are portrayed as savage and violent, living in caves and resembling animals more than humans, getting quickly drunk and living in caves. In Hálfdanar saga Brönufóstra, the horse and human meat is contrasted with the "edible" food given to the human attendees. Through this literature, it has been proposed that the authors marginalise the heathen past, relegating it to a position of uncivilised otherness.

Suggesting that the role of horses in cultic activity continued after the conversion, one site has been found at Kaupang showing butchering marks on horse remains.

=== Perception by Christian officials ===
It has been argued that Church leaders perceived the sacrifice of a horse and the eating of its meat as pagan practices, likely as the meat was seen as taboo in Roman culture and consequently acted as a differentiator between those who identified as Roman and those who were "others". The association was further reinforced by the religious significance in pagan cultures such as those of the Germanic peoples of Northwestern Europe. Allowances could be made, however, in cases of famine.

== Other ritual practices ==
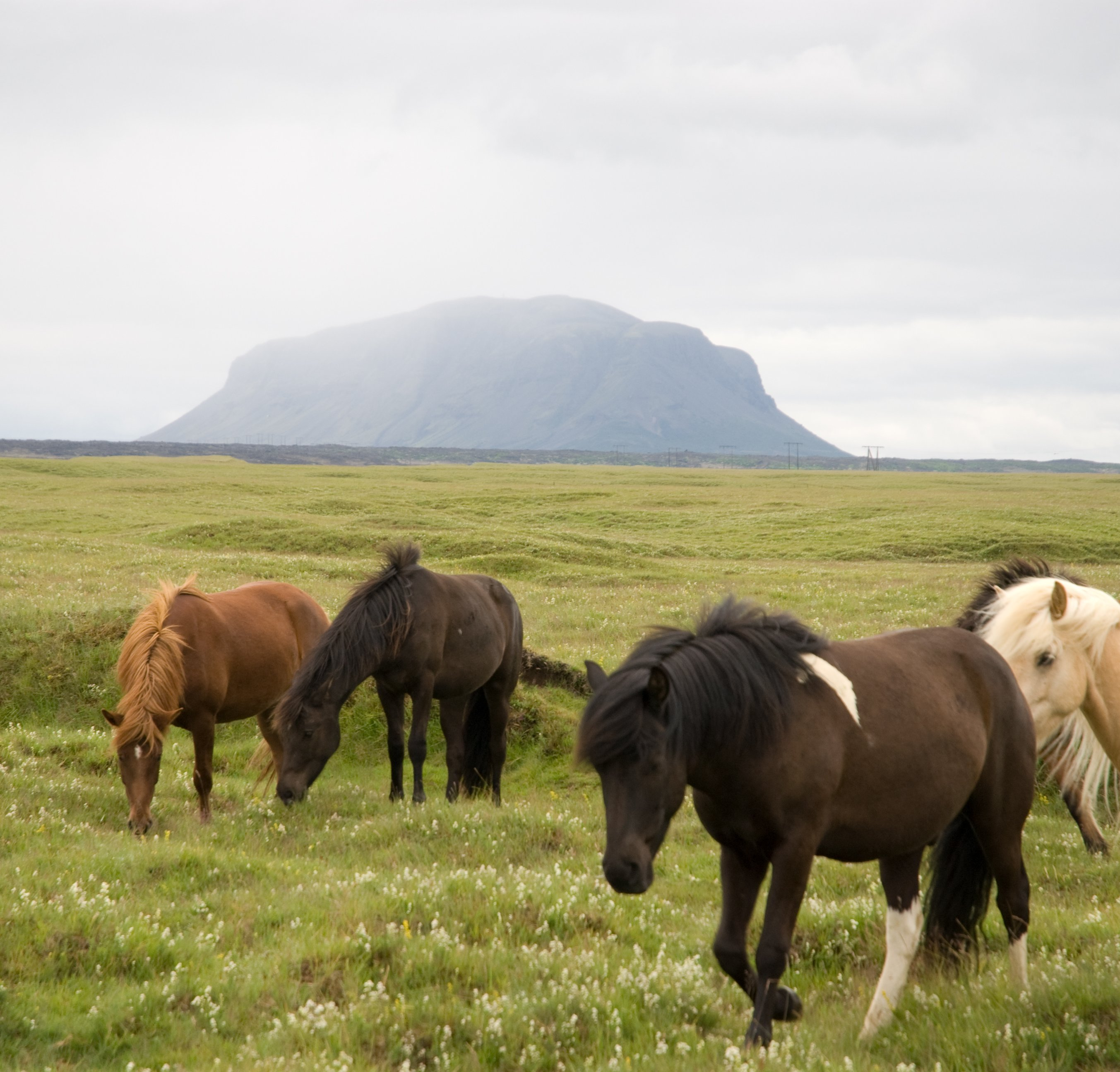
A herd of Icelandic horses

=== Divination ===
The Roman historian Tacitus describes that the Germanic peoples performed divination using the snorts of sacred horses. In Late Anglo-Saxon England similar practices seem to have been carried out given that they are criticised by Ælfric in his Lives of Saints who writes that '...he who trusteth in auguries, either from birds, or from sneezings, either from horses, or from dogs, he is no Christian, but is an infamous apostate'. In the Indiculus superstitionum et paganiarum, a list of condemned practices deemed pagan or superstitions from around Saxony, is a reference to divination by the dung of birds, horses and cattle. It has been noted that the list does not explicitly refer to this divination being performed among the Saxons, and could conceivably refer to practices from another pagan cultural group.

The role of horses in indicating fate is seen in sagas such as Grænlendinga saga, in which Eiríkr is riding to the ship to set sail for Vinland when the horse he was riding trips and falls, causing him to hurt his leg. At this, he tells his son Leifr that it was not intended for him to go to another land and he will not go with them on the journey. In a similar account in Njáls saga, Gunnar's horse slips while he is faring to a ship to sail from Iceland, causing him to see his homestead and change his mind about leaving. Because he turned around, he soon is killed. It has been suggested that in addition to being based on the role of horses in telling omens, this could also be a literary device used by the saga authors.

=== Niðstang ===
Niðstangir (horse heads placed on poles) are referred to in Egils saga and Vatnsdæla saga, and are used as insults.

=== Vǫlsa þáttr ===
Vǫlsa þáttr describes how in 1029 CE, Olaf II of Norway visited a heathen household in disguise. There, he witnessed a ritual involving a horse penis. Prior to the king's arrival, the horse had been butchered for its meat and the penis preserved in linen and leeks. Each evening, according to household custom, the family pass round the penis, which they refer to as "Vǫlsi", reciting verse. The penis is referred to as "sacral object" (Old Norse: blæti) and was seen by the old woman of the house as "her god" (Old Norse: guð sinn). At the end of the þáttr, Olaf throws the penis into a fire. The role of the horse penis has been debated, with some scholars suggesting it formed part of the cult of Frey, or of another god, with Vǫlsi acting as their physical presence.

== Proposed religious practices ==
=== Racing and fighting ===
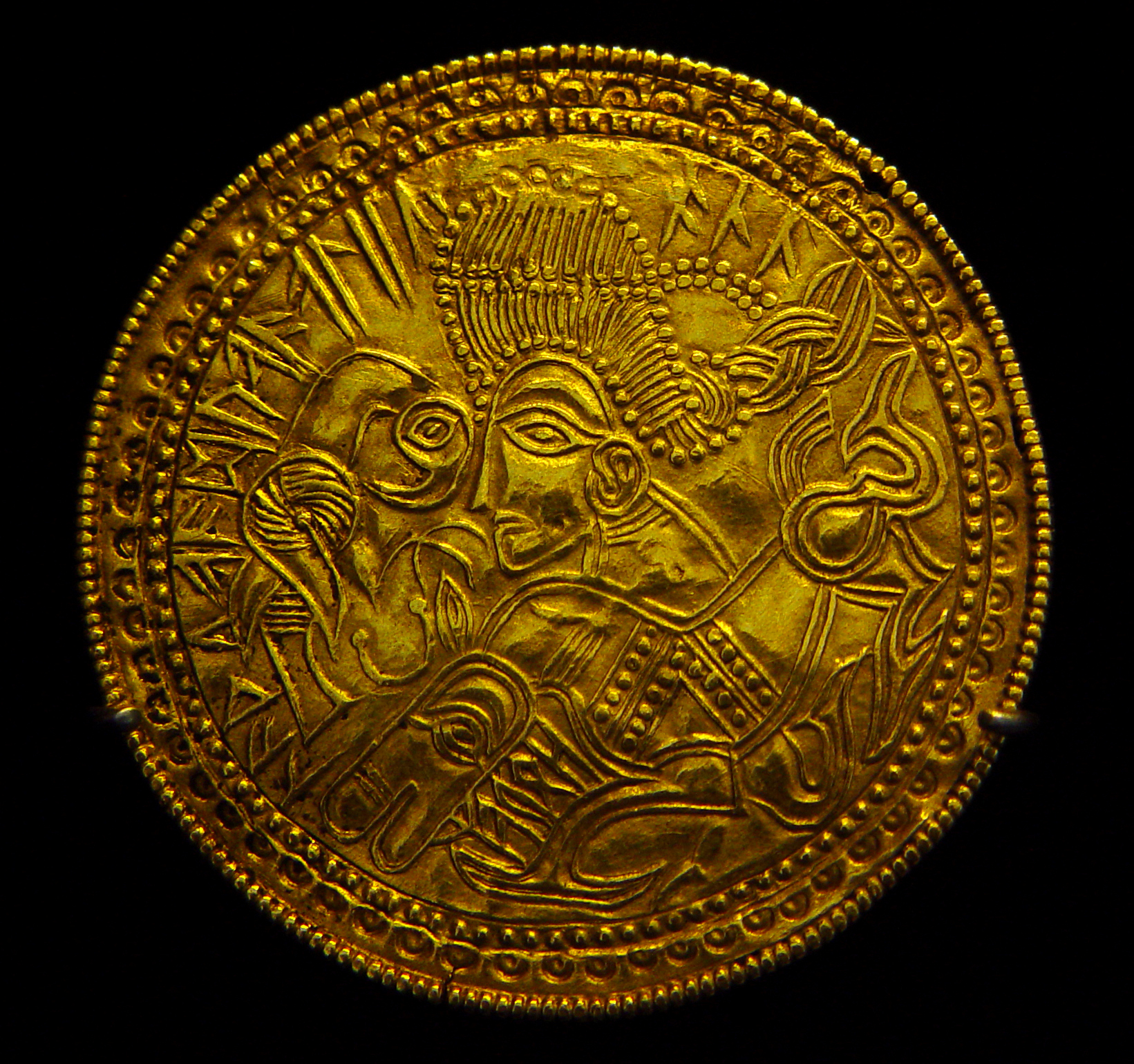
Bracteate DR BR42 bearing the inscription Alu and a figure on a horse

Horse racing and fighting, the latter known as hestavíg in Iceland, are attested among the early Germanic peoples and have been argued to have had a ritual function.

Horse races are attested among the Germanic peoples in works such as Beowulf and Icelandic sagas. The practice continued in England after Christianisation with Bede describing that around 688 CE, St. John of Beverly healed a man named Herebald after he fell from a horse during a race. In the same account, youths ask a bishop for permission to race their horses. Horse racing was later banned in England by the Synod of Clovesho in 746 CE. References to horse fighting and racing are also believed to occur in placenames such as Skedemosse in Öland, the first element of which is believed to derive from Old Norse: skeið (a horse race or fight). Large depositions of remains of horses that had been eaten were found at this site, leading to the suggestion that the outcome of the race or fight may have determined which horses were sacrificed, with both the winner and the loser being suggested. A horse fight coming before a blót is potentially depicted on one of the Golden Horns of Gallehus, dating to the 5th century CE, although this interpretation is equivocal.

Some scholars have suggested that fights and races were techniques used to collect blood from sacrificed animals as their blood flow would rise during exercise. Whether this is correct or not, Terry Gunnell has argued that horse racing and fighting had a particular significance among heathen Scandinavians as acts in themselves. He supports this proposal by referring to a 16th-century prohibition in Iceland, recorded in the Historia ecclesiasstica Islandiæ, that forbade priests from attending activities deemed to be relics of heathen customs, including horse fights. Similarly, Svale Solheim has argued, based on Norwegian folk traditions that the fights were originally part of larger festivals with the aim of ensuring good harvests. Horse fights are, however, not described as being held at the same time as any known heathen festivals, typically having occurred in summer and autumn.

=== Gifting to retainers ===
The gifting of high-quality and decorated horses by kings, as with rings, has been suggested to have been a key component of pre-Christian elite Germanic society, due to their perceived high importance and value. This practice is attested in an Anglo-Saxon context in sources such as the Coifi episode and in Hroðgar's rewarding of Beowulf. This act is similarly seen in mythological narratives such as Ríg offering horses to all his people in Rígsþula, and Thor giving Gullfaxi to his son Magni after fighting Hrungnir in Skáldskaparmál.

== See also ==
- Merseburg charms, the second of which involves Wodan healing an injured horse
- Animals in ancient Greece and Rome
- Horses in the Middle Ages
- Horse symbolism
