= Valhalla (1986 film) =

1986 Danish animated feature film

- Directed by: Peter Madsen; Jeffrey J. Varab
- Written by: Peter Madsen; Henning Kure; Niels Søndergaard
- Produced by: Anders Mastrup
- Starring: Dick Kaysø; Preben Kristensen
- Cinematography: Niels Grønlykke; Jan-Erik Sandberg
- Edited by: Lidia Sablone
- Music by: Ron Goodwin
- Production company: Swan Film Production A/S
- Distributed by: Metronome
- Release date: October 10, 1986 (Denmark)
- Running time: 76 minutes
- Country: Denmark
- Language: Danish
- Budget: DKK40 million (estimated)

Valhalla is a Danish animated feature film released in 1986 by Metronome, based on volumes one, four and five of the comics series of the same name, in its turn based on the Scandinavian tales of the Norse mythology, as they are told in Snorri Sturlusons so-called Younger Edda (c. 1230), and in the Poetic Edda. It was directed by Disney animator Jeffrey J. Varab and cartoonist Peter Madsen, the latter of which is one of the writers and the main artist on the Valhalla comics. The movie takes plot elements told from the three comic albums "Cry Wolf", "The Story of Quark" and "The Journey to Utgard-Loki".

The film was the most expensive Danish film of 1986 and proved popular with audiences with over half a million sold tickets, matching a tenth of Denmark's population at the time. However the enormous cost of the film prevented the producers from regaining the cost of production and, as a result, the film became a financial flop at the box office.

== Plot ==
Thor and Loki habitually visit Midgard (Earth), and one evening they take refuge for the night at a lonesome farmhouse, inhabited by a couple of ordinary Norse peasants and their two children, a boy named Tjalvi and his younger sister Röskva. Thor generously offers one of his goats which is dragging his chariot, as a feast dinner for all of them, but strongly warns any of the members of the household from breaking the bones. Loki, always treacherous, persuades the boy Tjalvi into doing exactly that, for the sake of the delicious marrow inside.

The next morning, Thor revives his goat, but is infuriated when he discovers that the animal has become lame. Loki suggests that they take the boy Tjalvi with them to Asgard as a servant as compensation. The gods and their new servant leave the farm and go back to Asgard via the Bifröst bridge. Once they arrive, they soon discover that Røskva has stowed away in the chariot, and so she is allowed to follow the company and her brother to Thor's home Bilskirnir. The glamor of the gods soon vanishes, as Thor is frequently away from home on new adventures, leaving Tjalvi and Røskva with the same menial tasks they did at home.

One day Loki shows up with a small nonverbal jötunn or "giant" boy named Quark, who almost immediately causes havoc in the thunder god's home. At first Loki claims that Quark 'followed him' home, but finally professes he 'won' Quark when he lost a bet with Utgard-Loki and now has to keep the boy until he behaves properly. Thor and Sif are driven crazy by Quark's antics and leaves. Soon, the children and Quark find they have something in common and befriend each other, while Loki just makes himself comfortably in 'his' new home. He acts as a lazy and cruel master of the house and the children and Quark finally run away to look up the mighty chief of the gods Odin, who lives in nearby Valhalla and who they suppose will help them against the unfair behaviour of Loki. Through Odin impassively listens to Røskva, the children are thrown out when Quark bothers the head of Mimir.

The children run out into the forest and build their own treehouse, setting up their own life. Almost everything is pure idyll, until Tjavli is visited by the ravens of Odin, Hugin and Munin (who have appeared as the narrators of the story). They lead Tjalvi to a sacred well where they present him with visions of the future: there he sees Thor trying to hold up Jörmungandr, the sea drying up and Thor hastily aging and dying. Suddenly, Thor shows up and brings the children back to Bilskirnir by force where he demands that Loki returns the boy to Utgard. Since Loki is unwilling and unable to bring Quark, Thor forces him to accompany him to Utgard, along with Røskva and Tjalvi.

The group travel Utgard, where the jötunn-king Utgard-Loki offers to take Quark back if they can overcome a series of challenges. First, Loki is set to win an eating competition against a jötunn named Loge. At first Loki seems to be victorious but he loses when Loge eats the entire trough. Thor is then challenged to drink from a giant drinking horn, but the horn does not seem to empty no matter how much he drinks. Thor demands another challenge and the jötunns asks to lift Utgard-Loki's cat instead. Despite the seemingly-small size of the cat, Thor is only able to lift a single one of the cat's paws off the floor; to regain his honor and save face, Thor demands a trial by combat. Utgard-Loki then calls for his ancient mother, Elle, whose feeble and aged appearance nonetheless frightens the other jötunns. Thor tries to wrestle her down but is unable to; instead he starts to age rapidly and the old hag wrestles him down to the floor instead.

While Thor wrestles the old woman, Hugin and Munin show Tjalvi, Röskva and Quark the visions again in a mirror: they see Loge moving strangely like fire, Thor trying to lift the Midgard Serpent, and Thor aging and dying. The children realize that the jötunns are using magic to cheat: the drinking-horn is secretly connected to the sea, Loge is actually an insatiable fire-spirit, Utgard-Loki's cat is in fact the Midgard Serpent, and the old woman is old age itself! Tjalvi tries to stop the wrestling match, but Thor appears to die of old age before Tjalvi can reach him. Tjalvi weeps over Thor's body, and his tears restore Thor to life and youth. Tjalvi and Röskva call out the jötunns' tricks. Thor is angry that the jötunns' have cheated, but Loki reassures Thor not to worry: he has a plan. The next morning, the two gods and the three children leave Utgard together. Utgard-Loki laughs at them from the palisade for losing the bet, but what had appeared to be Quark suddenly turns into a chicken: Loki has used his illusions to trick everyone into thinking the chicken was Quark, who is still inside the walls of Utgard and now has to remain there with the other jötunns. This saddens both Quark and Röskva, who wave sorrowfully to each other as Thor and Loki leave Utgard behind.

Back home at Bilskirnir, Thor gives Tjalvi a sword as a sign that he now sees Tjalvi as a man. Röskva, still seen as a child and feeling very alone and unwanted, walks sadly away into the forest, and returns to the treehouse which she and Tjalvi and Quark built together. Suddenly, to her great surprise and delight, Quark appears from inside the treehouse, having run away from Urgard. The two friends are happily reunited, with much embracing.

== Cast ==
| Character | Original | English |
|---|---|---|
| Thor | Dick Kaysø | Stephen Thorne |
| Loki | Preben Kristensen | Allan Corduner |
| Røskva | Laura Bro | Suzanne Jones (Roskva) |
| Tjalfe | Marie Ingerslev | Alexander Jones (Chalfe) |
| Odin | Nis Bank-Mikkelsen | Mark Jones |
| Útgarða-Loki | Nis Bank-Mikkelsen | Michael Elphick (Udgaardsloki) |
| Hymir | Benny Hansen | John Hollis |
| Rolf Sildeskind | Olaf Nielsen | Geoffrey Matthews (Rolf) |
| Quark | Thomas Eje | Thomas Eje |
| Hugin | Claus Ryskjær | Christopher Logue (Raven #1/Narrator #1) |
| Munin | Kirsten Rolffes | Vivian Pickles (Raven #2/Narrator #2) |
| The mother | Kirsten Rolffes | Miriam Margolyes |
| Mimer | Jesper Klein | Geoffrey Matthews (head) |
| The father | Jesper Klein | Geoffrey Matthews |
| Sif | Susse Wold | Miriam Margolyes |
| Elle | Susse Wold | Miriam Margolyes (Elda) |

=== Additional Voices ===
- Original: Benny Hansen, Thomas Eje, Claus Ryskjær, Jesper Klein, Percy Edwards, Valhalla Staben
- English: Percy Edwards

== Production ==
=== Development ===
The project was originally developed by character animator's Jeffrey J. Varab and Jakob Stegelmann.

They had previously established an animation-school in Copenhagen and trained most of the animators who would eventually work on the film. They managed to raise a small budget for the feature film adaptation before the project was eventually passed to production companies.

During production, the project ran into severe financial difficulties and was passed on between studios before being made by Swan Film.

In the final stages of production, the film's director Jeffrey J. Varab walked out of the project, due to disagreements with the new production management. On the final release version, Peter Madsen, who had drawn the comic books and been the film's art director, is credited as director, and Jeffrey J. Varab is credited as co-director.

At the time of its release, in October 1986 it was Denmark's most expensive film ever made, having cost around 40 million kroner. No Danish film has ever gone as much over budget since.

=== Soundtrack ===
The soundtrack was composed by Ron Goodwin and was performed by the Copenhagen Collegium Musicum orchestra. The soundtrack was released in 1987 and re-released in 1998 and has since been made available as digital purchase on several platforms. The 45 minute soundtrack would be Goodwin's last film composition.

- 01. Opening Title
- 02. Thor's arrival
- 03. Children's theme
- 04. Thor's fishing tale
- 05. Morning of the magic hammer
- 06. Farewell theme
- 07. Rainbow bridge
- 08. At home with Thor and Sif
- 09. Arrival of Loki and Quark
- 10. The wrath of Thor
- 11. The children in the forest

- 12. Building the tree-house
- 13. Whisteling theme
- 14. Giant's theme
- 15. Eating competition
- 16. Drinking competition
- 17. Thor lifting the cat
- 18. Dancing with Elle
- 19. Tjalfe and Thor
- 20. Giant party
- 21. Farewell to Quark
- 22. Tjalfe gets his sword
- 22. Finale

=== Casting ===
The Danish release version of the film features the voices of Dick Kaysø, Preben Kristensen, Laura Bro and Marie Ingerslev. The film was translated into other languages including English and German. During the production and animation stages, it was initially animated using an English language soundtrack featuring the voices of a primarily British cast. In the German dub, Christopher Lee voiced Thor and Odin.

== Release ==
The movie was released in October 1986. More than 100 artists had worked hard on the film for 4 years and the total cost of the film was DKK 35 million (5 million euro). The movie was an instant hit for several years and reached number 3 on the Danish box office list. In spite of selling more tickets than any other Danish film in 1986, its heavy cost inevitably made it a box-office flop. Swan Film made eight spin-off short films for television featuring Quark, the troll character in both the books and the film, before eventually closing down. Some of these shorts featured John Cleese as narrator.

The financial collapse of the Valhalla-production also brought down its sister company, LASER, which had been developing an animated feature film adaptation of Gilgamesh and a laserdisc video game, Pyramid, about a female hero battling various enemies inside an ancient temple structure. However, four animators and one producer prior to completing Valhalla regrouped and formed a new company, A. Film A/S, which to date is Denmark's most successful animation studio, producing frequent artistic triumphs and box-office hits.

== See also ==
- List of animated feature-length films
