= Valhalla (comics) =

Danish comic book series

- The cover of the 12th Valhalla album. Thor and Loki face two giantesses.

Publication information
- Publisher: Interpresse (1979–1987); Carlsen Comics (1987–present)
- Genre: Historical
- Publication date: 1979
- No. of issues: 15
- Main character(s): Thor, Odin and Loki

Creative team
- Created by: Henning Kure and Arne Stenby
- Written by: Peter Madsen, Hans Rancke-Madsen, Per Vadmand and Henning Kure.
- Artist: Peter Madsen
- Colorist(s): Søren Håkonsson, Jesper Ejsing

Valhalla is a Danish comic series, which offers a comedic view of the gods of Norse mythology. Originally commissioned for and published by Interpresse, it has been published by Carlsen Comics since 1978. In 1986, Valhalla was adapted into an animated feature film the studio A Film. On October 10, 2019, a more serious and dark live action adaptation was released.

== History ==
During 1976 and 1977, Henning Kure and Arne Stenby at Interpresse, a Danish publishing house, were planning to create a comic series based on the world of the Vikings. They offered the place of illustrating the comic to the young cartoonist Peter Madsen, who accepted, and also enlisted Hans Rancke-Madsen. The team set out to draw the first album (similar format as Tintin and Asterix) in a series of the adventures of the Norse gods, based on the Elder Eddas. Thor would very much be the hero of this series, along with Odin and Loki.

Valhalla started in 1978 as a strip running in the Danish newspaper Politiken. The first collected album came out in 1979. It was very well received, with several subsequent albums.

The tone of the albums has focused on humor, but the characters, and much of the plot, are based on the stories and legends in the Elder Eddas, and many albums have often featured deeper human issues. The albums are of high quality, and each took one or more years to produce. The first album was released in 1979, the second in 1982, and the thirteenth in 2006. They are very much in the tradition of finely drawn and well plotted Franco-Belgian comics like The Adventures of Tintin or Asterix, which also served as inspiration for the Valhalla comics.

On January 5, 2007, Valhalla was published on the Internet for the first time as the Danish paper Jyllands-Posten began publishing the 14th album, Muren ("The Wall"), in their online edition. One page was posted weekly in the form of an animated Flash program, in an attempt to transfer the large album pages to a format suitable for the web.

=== Creative teams ===
Valhalla would become the major breakthrough for illustrator Peter Madsen, who has developed greatly during his work on the series. Apart from doing the art for all the albums, he has been a co-writer for most of them. By far the most high-profile member of the creative team, the series is often referred to as "Peter Madsen's Valhalla".

Hans Rancke-Madsen has been the major writer of the series, together with Peter and other co-writers Per Vadmand and Henning Kure. Rancke-Madsen has written for all albums but eleven and twelve, but will return for the thirteenth album.

The colouring has always been a major part of the art of Valhalla. The first eight albums were coloured by Søren Håkonsson. Peter Madsen did the colours himself for the ninth album, while albums ten to twelve were done by Jesper Ejsing. Håkonsson returned for the thirteenth album, where he did half the pages, the other half being done by Madsen.

== Album titles and summaries ==
All the individual albums that were originally published by Interpresse are now published by Carlsen Comics.

1. Ulven er Løs ("Cry Wolf"), Interpresse (1979). Thor and Loki visit Midgard, the world of humans, and take on farmer's children Þjálfi and Röskva as their servants. At their return to Valhalla, they find that the monstrous Fenris Wolf has escaped its bonds. A flashback tells the story of how Loki and Tyr brought the wolf to Valhalla. An educational edition of this comic received The Danish School Librarians' Association's Children's Book Prize in 1982.

2. Thors Brudefærd ("Thor's Wedding"), Interpresse (1980). Based on the Þrymskviða. The giant (jötunn) Þrymr has stolen Thor's hammer Mjölnir, and will only return it in exchange for marrying the goddess Freyja. Thor and Loki have to dress up like Freyja and her maid to trick the giants and get the hammer back.

3. Odins Væddemål ("Odin's Wager"), Interpresse (1982). Odin is disappointed with the warriors the Valkyries bring for his army of Einherjar. He makes a wager with the Valkyries, that he can find better ones in Midgard by himself: three warriors that can best any and all of the Einherjar. The terms of the wager states that he is not allowed to use magic, and he therefore travels to Midgard personally. Odin remains gone for a long time, and rumor has it that he is dead, and his brothers Ve and Vili claim his throne. They change a lot of things in Asgard and become increasingly unpopular. They consolidate their power by stationing jötunn troops in Asgard. Meanwhile, Odin scouts Midgard to find the three warriors he needs. There are a lot of warriors but they all have some flaw: They are either too stupid, anti-authoritarian, Christian or about to get married. He finally finds three warriors called Fander, Hogur and Voldsdag who are indeed fierce warriors. He takes them back to Asgard where they defeat the jötnar, and dethrone Ve and Vili. To Odin's great surprise, the three warriors turn out to be Balder, Thor and Loki in disguise. Odin argues that he has won the wager anyway because those three are the mightiest warriors in Asgard. The story is not based on any particular myth alone, it consists of bits and pieces from the Prose Edda, Heimskringla and other sources. Fander, Hogur and Voldsdag are based on Fandral, Hogun and Volstagg (Warriors Three) from Marvel Comics.

4. Historien om Quark ("The Story of Quark"), Interpresse (1987). Loki returns from a visit to Utgard with a jötunn boy named Quark. The boy behaves horribly and becomes disliked by all the gods, Þjálfi and Röskva being the only ones he finally learns to like. (Quark isn't based on any original Norse myths, but is an original creation of Peter Madsen.) The story continues in the next album.

5. Rejsen Til Udgårdsloke ("The Journey to Útgarða-Loki"), Interpresse (1989). Thor, Loki, Þjálfi and Röskva travel to Utgard to have a competition with the jötnar led by Útgarða-Loki. The losers of the competition will have to keep Quark.

6. De Gyldne Æbler ("The Golden Apples"), Interpresse (1990). Loki is forced to help the jötunn Thjazi kidnap Idun and her apples of eternal youth. As the gods grow old without the apples, Thor and Loki travel to bring back the apples from the jötunn and his beautiful daughter Skadi.

7. Ormen i Dybet ("The Serpent in the Abyss"), Carlsen Comics (1991). An argument between Thor and Tyr leads them to see if either of them can catch the Midgård serpent that embraces the world. They travel to Utgard and stay with the giant Hymir, where Tyr is forced to face a past he would rather have forgotten. The comic was elected best comic album of 1992 at the Comics Mecca Convention, Ballerup, Denmark.

8. Frejas Smykke ("Freya's Necklace"), Carlsen Comics (1992). Freyja, the goddess of love, is bringing springtime to the worlds of men and gods. Odin plots to finally seduce her while Heimdall falls in love for the first time, and Loki gets caught in the middle of the trouble he starts between them all. The jewellery in the title is Brisingamen, and the story is originally a part of the Húsdrápa. The comic was chosen as the best foreign comic album of 1992 in Norway.

9. Den Store Udfordring ("The Big Challenge"), Carlsen Comics (1993). A jötunn boy named Magni appears in Valhalla claiming to be Thor's son. Odin is travelling Utgard, and makes a bet with the giant Hrungnir about whether Odin's Sleipnir or the giant's Guldfaxe is the faster horse. They race to Valhalla where Hrungnir proceeds to terrorise the gods. Thor challenges him to a duel, bringing Þjálfi and Magni along while the giants plot to kill Thor.

10. Gudernes Gaver ("The Gifts for the Gods"), Carlsen Comics (1997). The story of how the young Thor and Sif met, and of how the young Loki was made to travel to the dwarven realm and brought back several fantastic gifts, most notably the hammer Mjølner.

11. Mysteriet om Digtermjøden ("The Magic Mead"), Carlsen Comics (1998). Odin attempts to steal the special mead of poetry from the giants. We are told the story of how the tribes of the aesir and vanir gods made war back in the days, and of how they exchanged members to ensure the peace that was finally reached. The comic is a pastiche of Film Noir featuring Odin as the detective in what starts as a murder case. Peter Madsen won The SAS Prize for Best Nordic for this comic at the Raptus Festival in Bergen, Norway.

12. Gennem Ild og Vand ("Through Fire and Water"), Carlsen Comics (2001). The story is an amalgamation of the Grímnismál and the Þórsdrápa. The human king Geirröd has allied with the jötnar and brought misery to his country. As Odin and Loki travel to his kingdom to see what is happening, Odin is captured, though Geirröd does not know who he has caught. Loki and Thor return in an attempt to free him.

13. Balladen om Balder ("The Ballad of Baldr"), Carlsen Comics (2006). A rather free adaptation about the slaying of Baldr, based both on the accounts of the Poetic and Prose Edda, as well as Saxo Grammaticus' Gesta Danorum. Since Loki never had been really evil in any earlier books, he isn't a deliberate perpetrator, here. In the afterword the authors explain and motivate this that out of the three accounts of the story, it is only in the Prose Edda that Loki actually has any hand in Baldr's death. The goddess Hel makes her first and only appearance.

14. Muren ("The Wall"), Carlsen Comics (2007). Mostly based on the myth of Skírnismál. It also includes the myth on how Loki gave birth to Sleipnir, appearing in the Prose Edda. It was released one page at a time on the online edition of the Danish newspaper Jyllands-Posten as of January 5, 2007.

15. Vølvens syner ("The Sibyl's Visions"), Carlsen Comics (2009). The final album in the series contains the story about how Surtr sets off Ragnarok. It was released in 2009.

The albums have also been collected in anthologies in some countries. All albums have been translated into Swedish and Norwegian with the earlier albums also translated into Dutch, German, French, Finnish, Icelandic, Faroese and Indonesian, so somebody who knows these languages or anyone a bit familiar with Norse Mythology can enjoy these renditions of the adventures of Thor and Loki.

== Animated film ==
Valhalla was adapted into an animated film in 1986. The story is based on albums one, four and five, focusing on Tjalfe, Røskva and their meeting with Thor, Loki and Quark, however the film actually came out before the volumes featuring the main part of the story, the retelling of the myth of Thor's bridal journey, was made and published. Thus, those volumes are in fact based on the film rather than the other way around, but with additions based on the myths and on Peter Madsen, Hans Rancke-Madsen, Per Vadmand and Henning Kure's further original ideation.

Although the film was in some ways a milestone for Scandinavian animation, it received mixed criticism. The production was hampered by trouble such as changes in the creative team and economic difficulties, and was passed on between studios to end up with Swan Film Production. In the end it cost nearly 30 million Danish kroner (approximately 5 million $), which it had no chance of bringing back in. No follow up to the film was made, although six short spin-off films, featuring Quark, were made by Swan Film Production. Quark is also the protagonist of his own comic series, of which several books have been published. Several more shorts were planned, but the studio collapsed from the troubles the Valhalla film had brought.

Several animators from the project later went together to found the studio A. Film A/S, one of the most successful animation studios in Scandinavia.

In 2003, the movie was released on DVD in Denmark.

== Stamp and playing cards ==
In 2002 Post Danmark the Danish postal service made four postage stamps featuring Danish comic book characters. Peter Madsen drew the artwork for the Valhalla stamp and he also made a deck of playing cards with his characters. The other three stamps featured Rasmus Klump, Jungledyret Hugo and Cirkeline.

== Live action film ==
In 2017, a live action adaptation of Valhalla was announced. It has been said to be serious and dark in tone, but generally follows the story of Tjalfe, Røskva, Thor, Loki and Quark once again, with more focus on Røskva than Tajlfe. A trailer was released first, then the film was on October 10, 2019.

The film received primarily negative reviews, with critics both critiquing hammy, over-acted performances from certain cast members, such as Roland Møller (Thor), as well as the changes to the story found in both the original mythology and comic books, but also praised the mythological and historical concepts they added, such as the fact that the Norse people used mushrooms as psychedelics, which is presented in a comedic fashion. The addition of Röskva being a prophesied "Child of Light" savior figure that can stop Ragnarok was however criticizied as generic, underdeveloped and for not being based in either the world of the comics or real Norse mythology.
