= The Ballad of Baldr =

Valhalla comic book

The Ballad of Baldr (Balladen om Balder)
- Series: Valhalla (comics)

Creative team
- Writers: Peter Madsen & Henning Kure
- Artists: Peter Madsen & Søren Håkansson

Original publication
- Date of publication: 2006
- Language: Danish

Chronology
- Preceded by: Through Fire and Water
- Followed by: The Wall

The Ballad of Baldr (Danish: Balladen om Balder) is the 13th volume in the Valhalla comic series. It's a retelling of the death of Baldr, drawing from many different (and sometimes contradicting) versions of the myth.

== Plot ==
Loki finds himself lost in Helheim. Hel, the goddess of the dead, commands him into her chamber. After misunderstanding Loki's various euphemism about his own death, Hel explains that Loki is not dead but dreaming, thus being at once in the land of the dead and the land of the gods. Hel says that she is bored with the dead and wishes to leave Helheim and join the other gods. Loki says that is impossible, which causes Hel to cry, starting a rain in Helheim as the realm and the goddess are the same. Hel demands that Loki helps her since he is her father. Loki denies being her father (Loki also denies knowing where Fenrir came from in Cry Wolf and Sleipnir in The Wall, but in The Wall Sleipner is shown to be Loki's son, indicating that Loki is ignorant or lying about his kinship). Hel says she will force Loki one way or another to get her out of Helheim. Loki has a second dream where the gods invade his hall, blaming him for the death of Baldr. Loki's (nonexistent) sons are brought out and one is turned into a wolf (a whole Fenriswolf) and proceeds to rip out the other's gut, which is turned into a serpent (a whole Midgard serpent). Loki is then bound on a rock with poison dripping into his eyes. Loki wakes up, finds himself back in Valhalla, in time to see the Ride of the Valkyries, bringing fallen, rowdy warriors from Midgard.

Loki is overtly relieved to see Baldr alive and well, causing the other gods to be suspicious of Loki. The rowdy berserkers the Valkyries have brought start a fight when one of them touches the Valkyrie Nanna's buttock, causing the blind god Höðr to lose his walking stick. As he searches for it, he bumps into Nanna. The two become enamoured when Höðr compliments Nanna after gently touching her hands.

However, Baldr also becomes involved in Nanna after seeing her bathe naked. This angers Höðr since he will never see Nanna that way. Höðr confides his wish to murder Baldr out of envy. Loki tries to discourage him by lying that Baldr is invulnerable, a gift from a Norn; however, this only makes Höðr even more jealous. Höðr ends up stealing a magic sword from the trolls and tries to hit Baldr. However, Baldr is shown to actually be invulnerable. Frigg, worried about Loki's behaviour, has made everything that lives on the earth promise not to harm Baldr, since she is the earth goddess. The other gods make a game out of throwing weapons at Baldr for target practise since their weapons just bounce off. Loki decides to pull a prank on Höðr for all the worry he has brought him through. Loki pretends to be a norn named Þökk and tells Baldr he has a poison that will make him be able to kill Baldr. Loki gives a disgusting soup and takes a mistletoe, without much thought, and turns it into an arrow shape and tells Höðr it is a magic arrow. Höðr throws it at Baldr, hitting his heart and killing him. Frigg explains that the mistletoe does not live on the earth, it lives on trees, and because of that made no promise to Frigg. The other gods think of it as a horrible accident, but Höðr is overcome with regret knowing the truth. Loki goes into hiding, fearing the vengeance of the gods. However, both Loki and Höðr are dragged into a dream and brought to Helheim by Baldr. He tells them that when he got to Helheim, Hel mocked Loki for his clumsiness. Baldr told her that Valhalla was not as great as everyone thinks and improvised an imitation of the einherjar which caused Hel to burst into laughter. Hel's laughter changed Helheim into a beautiful forest. Seeing what Hel's laughter could do, Baldr fell in love with her, which cured Hel's depression. With Helheim being a much more pleasant place for the dead, and Baldr and Hel being a happy couple, Höðr can return to Valhalla without guilt and continue his relationship with Nanna.

== Background ==
Adapting the myth of Baldr's death was problematic, mostly because of the different versions of the story. In doing research, the authors were surprised to find out that the popular version of Loki being behind the murder only appeared in the Prose Edda. In the other sources, Loki had nothing to do with it. The authors then decided that since Loki had not been a truly evil character in the earlier stories, rather than cause Baldr's death he would try to stop it, fearing he would be blamed. The authors focused on that the universal feature of the story was that Baldr was killed by his brother Höðr with mistletoe. Since they were not going with Snorri's version they used the story found in Gesta Danorum by Saxo Grammaticus, which had the brothers being human princes fighting over a princess. They also changed Nanna from a goddess to a valkyrie, reasoning that since Brynhildr was a princess who had become a valkyrie, Nanna could have been the same.
