= The Sibyl's Visions (Valhalla) =

The Sibyl's Visions (Vølvens syner)
- Series: Valhalla (comics)

Creative team
- Writers: Peter Madsen & Henning Kure
- Artists: Peter Madsen & Jonas Sonne

Original publication
- Date of publication: 2009
- Language: Danish

Chronology
- Preceded by: The Wall

The Sybil's Visions (Danish Vølvens syner, literally The Visions of the Völva) is the 15th and final volume in the Valhalla comic series. The volume is a retelling of the myth of Ragnarök and is, as the original title suggests, primarily based on the Völuspa. Like the other later volumes in the series, it was extensively researched. The result of this research is described in the afterword and in detail in writer Henning Kure's book I begyndelsen var skriget: Vikingetidens myter om skabelsen. ähzfy XOXO cnn

== Plot ==
The prologue states that all stories have an end, which is characterised by being connected to a beginning; an effect of the causes. The narrator states that the Old Norse people had a name for this and it was rǫk. The gods also had their own rǫk: Ragnarök. The narrator concludes that most people think this is the name of the end of the world and chaos, but that it's in fact almost the other way around: It's simply the end of the story the gods started when they created the world.

Following the events of The Wall, Þjálfi and Röskva are on their way home to Midgard. Röskva is furious because of Þjálfi's rite of passage in the previous graphic novel and wants to be considered an adult too. As they move through the winterlandscape, Röskva suddenly enters a trance and watches a free and now rabid Fenrir (totally unlike the harmless wolf of the first volume). Röskva tries to call for him but Fenrir runs through the skies and devours the sun. Röskva is woken by Þjálfi who has found wolftracks leading to Freyja's hall Folkvangr. They find Folkvangr ruined and Freyja and her cats gone, save for a kitten who Þjálfi takes in. Röskva draws the conclusion she has had a vision and that she is experiencing her own rite of passage: becoming a völva (a female shaman). The children are attacked by two giants but are saved by Thor who has been looking for the children to tell them goodbye. Thor takes Þjálfi and Röskva back to Valhalla to report about Freyja's disappearance. Odin and Mimir conclude that it's the working of the giants. Without Freyja, the sun can not be reawoken and the winter will last forever. Odin believes the giants wants to disrupt the order of the gods and sends Huginn and Muninn to scout for Freyja so that the gods can free her. Loki is sent to scout as well, but Þjálfi and Röskva hide within the magic skin Loki burrows from Frigg to come along. This causes the skin to break and strands them on the icecovered ocean. While Þjálfi goes to scout, Röskva has a second vision, now of Jörmungandr with lightning coming from his mouth. Röskva wakes up with Loki, both hearing distant noise. They follow the noise and discovers an ice free valley filled with giants. The giants have Fenrir in chains, having tamed and tortured him into a vicious beast. Röskva and Loki are captured by the giants and presented to their leader, Surtr. Surt explains that he has freed Fenrir and used him to breakdown Folkvangr and kidnapped a hibernating Freyja. Using seidr he has converted Freyja's sun powers into a magic sword: Lævateinn. This allows him and the sons of muspell to live in a valley of warmth while the gods, humans and even the non-muspel giants freeze to death in the eternal winter. Loki tries to trick Surtr to attack Valhalla, believing him to be no match for Odin and Thor. The giants set sail with Naglfar, bringing Loki and Röskva with them. On their way, they come across Jörmungandr, who is frozen into the ocean. Surtr uses Lævateinn to free him and anger the monster hoping it will move towards Valhalla. Surtr also boasts that Fenrir has eaten Freyja alive. Huginn and Muninn overhears them and hurries back to Asgard to tell Odin. Loki panics as he realises his scheme has gone terribly wrong. As the horde of Muspel pass Þjálfi and the cat, whom he has named Miff, the ice melts and they are thrown into the abyss. However, Þjálfi and Miff awakens on the shore of Valhalla. His relief is cutshort when he hears a horn blow. Heimdallr has seen Naglfar, with Loki at the helm, thinking him a traitor and has sounded the Gjallarhorn. Huginn and Muninn reaches Odin to tell him of Freyja's demise as the giants attack Valhalla. The gods, the valkyries and the einherjar rush out to do battle with the giants. Röskva and Loki tries to make their way to Valhalla through the battle but Loki is attacked by Heimdallr. Þjálfi meet up with Röskva and they are saved from the giants by Thor. Thor sends them with his chariot to Valhalla while he goes to fight Jörmungandr. Surtr hit him with fire from Lævateinn, which causes Thor to drop Mjolnir and be swallowed by the serpent. With Freyja and Thor dead, Odin does not have power enough to stop the giants and disspairs as Valhalla burns. Röskva arrives and tells Odin that she has sent Thor's sons to throw Mjolnir into the mouth of Jörmungandr. Odin tells Röskva that Thor is in Helheim but Röskva replies that he is still the thundergod even if he is there. This is the meaning of her visions: the strongest powers are still powers where ever they may be. Odin realises what needs to be done and tells Röskva that Miff is Þjálfi's fylgia, if they jump from the walls of Valhalla Miff will bring them to Midgard. Röskva, Þjálf and Miff jump, followed by Loki wishing to escape the fall of the gods. Odin jumps into Fenrir's jaws. As the children and Loki journey through the worlds, Röskva has a final vision. She finds herself in Ginnungagap, the void before the world was made, and sees Gungnir fall down on a sleeping Freyja. This awakens her and she turns Gungnir into Lævateinn and then a sun cross. Röskva sees Freyja taking this cross from a furious Surtr who is burned to ashes. The sun melts the winter of the giants and they all drown. Röskva sees all the gods, including Baldr, reborn on Iðavöllr. The vision ends with Röskva and the gods looking up on Yggdrasil as "the mighty one who rules over all" emerges from the tree; here identified as Odin.

== Background ==
Madsen & Kure had known for a long time that when they felt it was time for Valhalla to end they had to deal with the myth of Ragnarök. Originally they had the idea that the events would be told by a völva to the Gods, with the ending suggesting that Ragnarök was imminent. However, they both figured that Ragnarök had to happen for real within the story. The later stories had also been reflecting Henning Kure's increasing interest in Norse Mythology, that had gone far enough for Kure to learn Old Norse, read the Poetic Edda in the original language and started writing serious articles about the subject. Kure's research influenced how the story was presented, with the ending suggesting rebirth. The visions of Röskva allowed the authors to present the more abstract and intangible aspects of the myth without leaving the more concrete approach of the earlier graphic novels. Having Röskva becoming a völva was intended as Röskva's rite of passage, since the profession was considered exclusively feminine, it allowed for Röskva to have an important part of the events.
