= Þjálfi and Röskva =

Siblings in Norse mythology

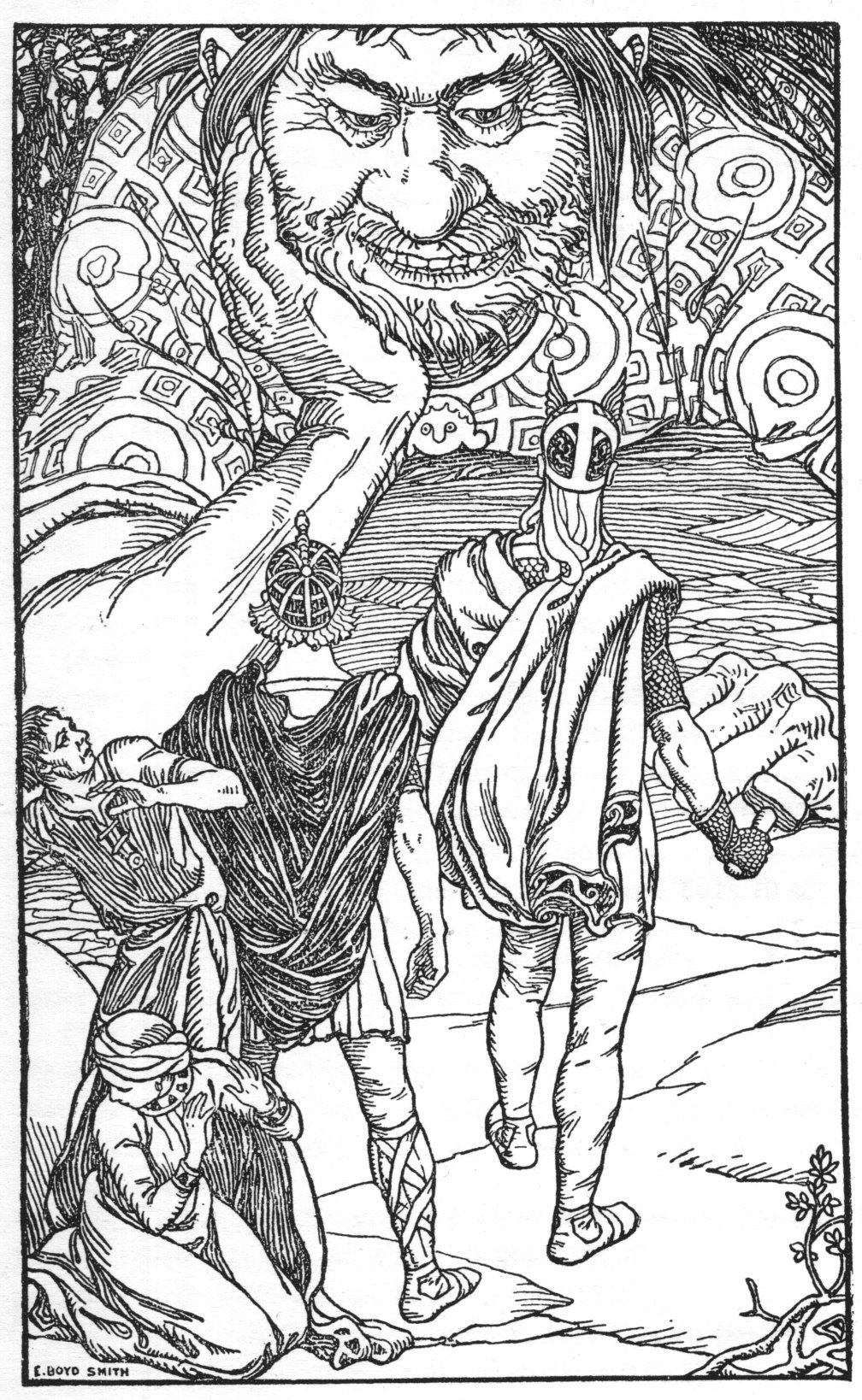
Þjálfi and Röskva turn away in fear as Thor and Loki face the immense jötunn Skrymir in an illustration (1902) by Elmer Boyd Smith.

In Norse mythology, Þjálfi (Old Norse: [ˈθjɑːlve]) and Röskva (O.N.: Rǫskva [ˈrɔskwɑ]), also known as Thjalfi and Roskva, are two siblings, a boy and a girl, respectively, who are servants of the god Thor. Þjálfi receives a single mention in the Poetic Edda, compiled in the 13th century from earlier traditional material, while both Þjálfi and Röskva are attested in the Prose Edda, written in the 13th century by Snorri Sturluson and in poetry of skalds.

In the Poetic Edda, Thor recounts an incident where Þjálfi is chased away by she-wolves but gives no additional information about him. In the Prose Edda, Þjálfi and Röskva are the children of peasant farmers. Thor and Loki stay a night at their farmstead and there Thor shares with the family the meat of his goats, Tanngrisnir and Tanngnjóstr, which he can resurrect provided that their bones are intact. Þjálfi sucks the marrow from a leg bone from one of the goats. When Thor resurrects the goats the next morning, he finds that one of the goats is lame in the leg and becomes enraged. As a result, Thor maintains Þjálfi and Röskva as his servants.

From the farm, Thor, Loki, Þjálfi, and Röskva head out to a vast forest in the realm of Jötunheimr. They spend the night in a building that turns out to be the glove of an immense being, Skrymir. The next night, Thor finds that he is unable to kill Skrymir, and the group sleeps in fear beneath an oak. The following day the group arrives at Útgarða-Loki's keep and Útgarða-Loki has each member (excluding Röskva) perform a feat to gain boarding. Each member who performs a feat loses, including Þjálfi, who thrice loses a race against a figure named Hugi.

After the group spends the night at the keep, Útgarða-Loki reveals that he was in fact Skrymir and that Thor actually nearly killed him. Similarly, the contests were not as they seemed; Þjálfi, for example, raced against thought itself (Hugi meaning "thought" in Old Norse). Útgarða-Loki notes that he and the inhabitants were terrified at what the group was able to achieve, and that they must part. Útgarða-Loki and his keep disappear.

== Etymology ==
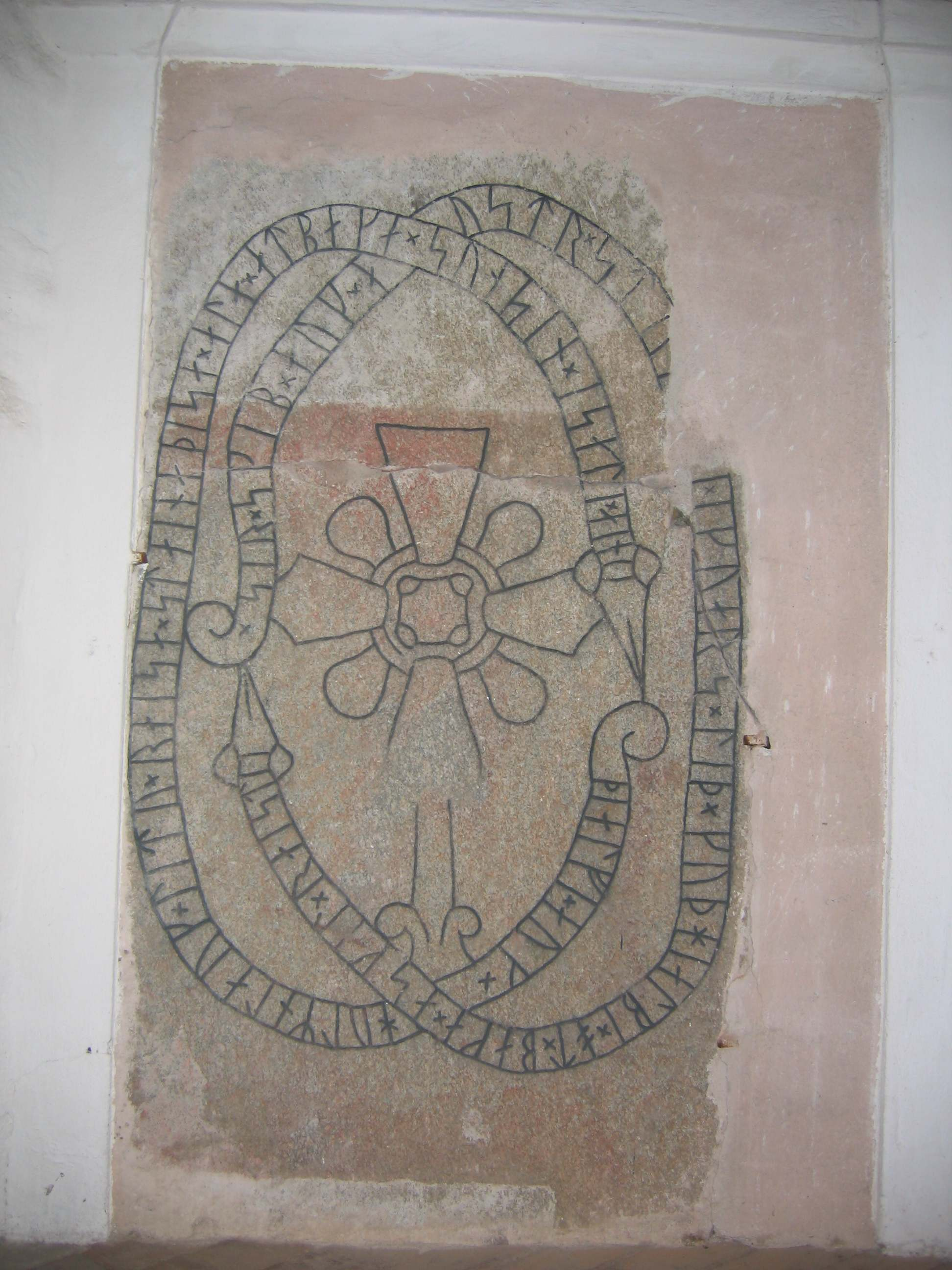
Ingvar runestone U 778 with the personal name Þialfi.

The etymology of the name Þjálfi is unclear. An origin in *þewa-alfaR, meaning "serving-elf", has been proposed. The name also appears as a personal name on over 12 runestones in Sweden, including runestone Sö 194, U 56, U 681, U 778, U 867, U 875, U 925, U 948, U 1052, and U Fv1990;32B. The name Röskva derives from Old Norse "rǫskr", meaning 'fast, quick, brave, skilled'.

== Attestations ==
=== Poetic Edda ===
While Röskva is absent, Þjálfi receives a single mention in the Poetic Edda poem Hárbarðsljóð. In the poem, the god Thor tells Hárbarðr (the god Odin in disguise) that he fought women in Hlesey (now the island Læsø in Denmark). Hárbarðr says that fighting women is a shameful thing. Thor responds that these females were she-wolves—hardly women at all—and details that they attacked his ship, threatened him with iron clubs and chased after Þjálfi:

Benjamin Thorpe translation: She-wolves they were, and scarcely women. They crushed my ship, which with props I had secured, with iron clubs threatened me, and drove away Thiâlfi. What meanwhile didst thou, Harbard?	Henry Adams Bellows translation: She-wolves they were like, and women little; My ship, which well I had trimmed, did they shake; With clubs of iron they threatened, and Thjalfi they drove off. What, Harbarth, didst thou the while?

=== Prose Edda ===
Both Þjálfi and Röskva are mentioned in the Prose Edda books Gylfaginning and Skáldskaparmál:

==== Gylfaginning ====
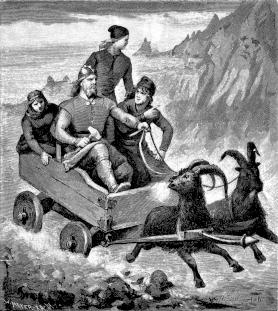
Thor, Loki, Þjálfi, and Röskva ride in Thor's goat-driven chariot in an illustration by Mårten Eskil Winge from an 1893 edition of the Poetic Edda.

In the Prose Edda book Gylfaginning (chapter 44), the enthroned figure of Third reluctantly relates a tale in which Thor and Loki are riding in Thor's chariot, pulled by his two goats. Loki and Thor stop at the home of a peasant farmer, and there they are given lodging for a night. Thor slaughters his goats, skins them and puts them in a pot. When the goats are cooked, Loki and Thor sit down for their evening meal. Thor invites the peasant family to share the meal with him and they do so.

At the end of the meal, Thor places the skins of the goat on the opposing side of the fire and tells the peasants to throw the bones of the goats on to the goatskins. The peasant's son Þjálfi takes one of the goat ham-bones and uses a knife to split it open, breaking the bone to get to the marrow.

After staying the night, Thor wakes up and gets dressed before the break of dawn. Thor takes his hammer Mjöllnir, raises it, and blesses the goat skins. Resurrected, the goats stand, but one of the two goats is lame in the hind leg. Noting this new lameness, Thor exclaims that someone has mistreated the bones of his goats; that someone broke the ham-bone during the meal the night before. Third notes that there is no need to draw out the tale, for:

Everyone can imagine how terrified the peasant must have been when he saw Thor making his brows sink down over his eyes; as for what could be seen of the eyes themselves, he thought he would collapse at just the very sight. Thor clenched his hands on the shaft of the hammer so that the knuckles went white, and the peasant did as one might expect, and all his household, they cried out fervently, begged for grace, offered to atone with all their possessions.

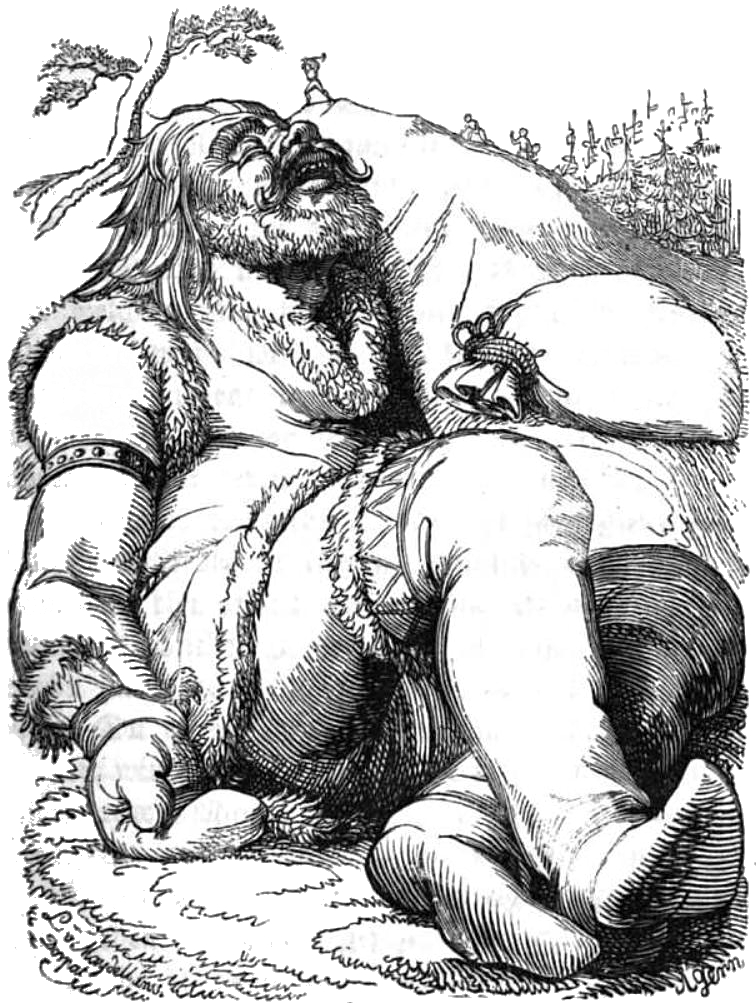
Thor issues blows to the sleeping Skrýmir while the group looks on in an illustration (1842) by Ludwig von Maydell.

At realizing how terrified he has made the peasants, Thor calms down and from them accepts a settlement of their children Þjálfi and Röskva. The two children become his servants and have remained so since. Minus the goats, Thor, Loki, and the two children continue east until they arrive at a vast forest in Jötunheimr. They continue through the woods until dark. The four seek shelter for the night and discover an immense building. Finding shelter in a side room, they experience earthquakes through the night. The earthquakes cause all four to be fearful, except Thor, who grips his hammer in defense. The building turns out to be the huge glove of Skrýmir, who has been snoring throughout the night, causing what seemed to be earthquakes. The next night, all four sleep beneath an oak tree near Skrýmir in fear.

Thor wakes up in the middle of the night, and a series of events occur where Thor twice attempts to destroy the sleeping Skrýmir with his hammer. Skrýmir awakes after each attempt, only to say that he detected an acorn falling on his head or that he wonders if bits of tree from the branches above have fallen on top of him. The second attempt awakes Skrýmir. Skrýmir gives them advice; if they are going to be cocky at the castle of Útgarðr it would be better for them to turn back now, for Útgarða-Loki's men there won't put up with it. Skrýmir throws his knapsack onto his back and abruptly goes into the forest and "there is no report that the Æsir expressed hope for a happy reunion".

The four travelers continue their journey until midday. They find themselves facing a massive castle in an open area. The castle is so tall that they must bend their heads back to their spines to see above it. At the entrance to the castle is a shut gate, and Thor finds that he cannot open it. Struggling, all four squeeze through the bars of the gate, and continue to a large hall. Inside the great hall are two benches, where many generally large people sit on two benches. The four see Útgarða-Loki, the king of the castle, sitting.

Útgarða-Loki says that no visitors are allowed to stay unless they can perform a feat. Loki, standing in the rear of the party, is the first to speak, claiming that he can eat faster than anyone. Loki competes with a being named Logi to consume a trencher full of meat but loses. Útgarða-Loki asks what feat the "young man" can perform, referring to Þjálfi. Þjálfi says that he will attempt to run a race against anyone Útgarða-Loki chooses. Útgarða-Loki says that this would be a fine feat yet that Þjálfi had better be good at running, for he is about to be put to the test. Útgarða-Loki and the group go outside to a level-grounded course.

At the course, Útgarða-Loki calls for a small figure by the name of Hugi to compete with Þjálfi. The first race begins and Þjálfi runs, but Hugi runs to the end of the course and then back again to meet Þjálfi. Útgarða-Loki comments to Þjálfi that he will have to run faster than that, yet notes that he has never seen anyone who has come to his hall run faster than that. Þjálfi and Hugi run a second race. Þjálfi loses by an arrow-shot. Útgarða-Loki comments that Þjálfi has again run a fine race but that he has no confidence that Þjálfi will be able to win a third. A third race between the two commences and Þjálfi again loses to Hugi. Everyone agrees that the contest between Þjálfi and Hugi has been decided.

Thor agrees to compete in a drinking contest but after three immense gulps fails. Thor agrees to lift a large, gray cat in the hall but finds that it arches his back no matter what he does, and that he can only raise a single paw. Thor demands to fight someone in the hall, but the inhabitants say doing so would be demeaning, considering Thor's weakness. Útgarða-Loki then calls for his nurse Elli, an old woman. The two wrestle but the harder Thor struggles the more difficult the battle becomes. Thor is finally brought down to a single knee. Útgarða-Loki said to Thor that fighting anyone else would be pointless. Now late at night, Útgarða-Loki shows the group to their rooms and they are treated with hospitality.

The next morning the group gets dressed and prepares to leave the keep. Útgarða-Loki appears, has his servants prepare a table, and they all merrily eat and drink. As they leave, Útgarða-Loki asks Thor how he thought he fared in the contests. Thor says that he is unable to say he did well, noting that he is particularly annoyed that Útgarða-Loki will now speak negatively about him. Útgarða-Loki, once the group has left his keep, points out that he hopes that they never return to it, for if he had an inkling of what he was dealing with he would never have allowed the group to enter in the first place. Útgarða-Loki reveals that all was not what it seemed to the group. Útgarða-Loki was in fact the immense Skrýmir, and that if the three blows Thor attempted to land had hit their mark, the first would have killed Skrýmir. In reality, Thor's blows were so powerful that they had resulted in three square valleys.

The contests, too, were an illusion. Útgarða-Loki reveals that Loki had actually competed against wildfire itself, consuming all in its path (Logi, Old Norse "flame"); Þjálfi had raced against thought, always faster than action (Hugi, Old Norse "thought"); Thor's drinking horn had actually reached to the ocean and with his drinks he lowered the ocean level (resulting in tides). The cat that Thor attempted to lift was in actuality the world serpent, Jörmungandr, and everyone was terrified when Thor was able to lift the paw of this "cat", for Thor had actually held the great serpent up to the sky. The old woman Thor wrestled was in fact old age (Elli, Old Norse "old age"), and there is no one that old age cannot bring down. Útgarða-Loki tells Thor that it would be better for "both sides" if they did not meet again. Upon hearing this, Thor takes hold of his hammer and swings it at Útgarða-Loki but he is gone and so is his castle. Only a wide landscape remains.

==== Skáldskaparmál ====
In the Prose Edda book Skáldskaparmál (chapter 4), a list of ways of referring to Thor is provided, including "lord of Þjálfi and Röskva". In the same chapter, a quote from Þórsdrápa by the 10th century skald Eilífr Goðrúnarson is provided that refers to Þjálfi as "Röskva's brother". In the poem fragment, Þjálfi stands enraged, Thor lands a winning blow on his target, and the two feel no fear.

== In popular culture ==
Þjálfi and Röskva are two major characters in the Danish Valhalla comics series, and the animated feature based on it. Röskva is identified as being the Völva in Völuspá who foresees Ragnarök.

Thialfi was shown as a supporting character in Marvel's Thor comics.

Roskva and Thialfi (Alfi) appear as major characters in the junior novel The Sleeping Army by author Francesca Simon. 2019

Røskva and Tjalfe appear as major characters in the 2019 movie "Valhalla: The Legend of Thor," original title, "Valhalla."

The Dutch national indoor ice skating stadium Thialf in the Frysian city of Heerenveen is renamed after Thialfi. The name was derived from ice skating union Thialf in Heerenveen founded in 1885, one of the oldest ice skating unions in The Netherlands.
