= Geras =

Ancient Greek deity

- Personification of Old age
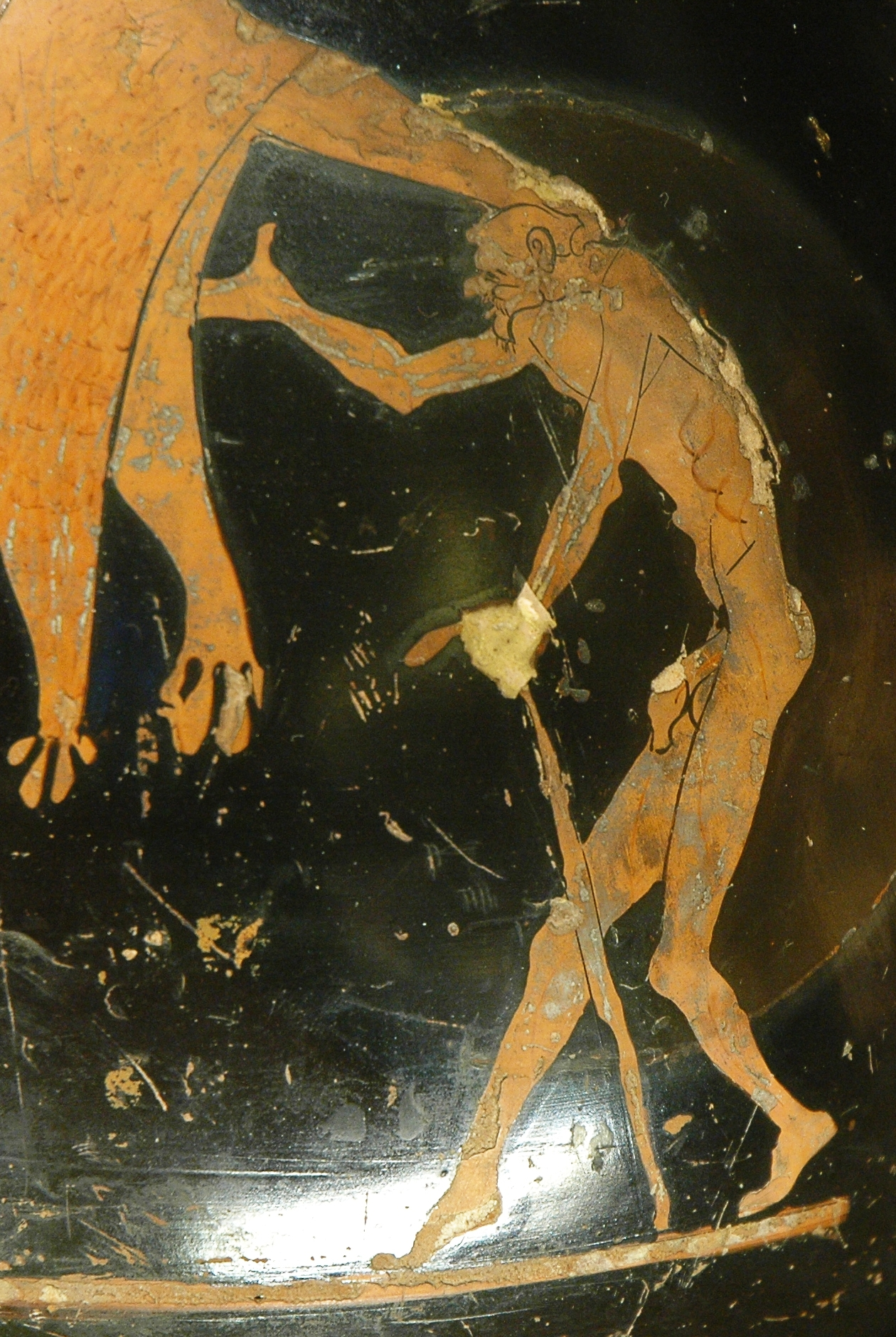
- Geras, detail of an Attic red-figure pelike, c. 480–470 BC, Louvre
- Abode: Erebus
- Parents: Nyx alone or Erebus and Nyx

In Greek mythology, Geras (Ancient Greek: Γῆρας, romanized: Gêras, lit. 'old age') is the god of old age. He was typically depicted as a tiny, shriveled old man. Gēras's opposite was Hebe, the goddess of youth. In Latin, he is referred to as Senectus. He is known primarily from vase depictions that show him with the hero Heracles; the mythic story that inspired these depictions has been lost. Otherwise, Geras has a very limited role in both religion and mythology.

== Etymology ==
The Greek word γῆρας (gĕras) means "old age" or in some other literature "dead skin" or "slough of a snake"; this word is the root of English words such as "geriatric" and "progeria".

== Mythology ==
According to Hesiod, Geras is one of the many sons and daughters that the night goddess Nyx produced on her own parthenogenetically. However, later authors Hyginus and Cicero both add Erebus, Nyx's consort, as the father.

In the myth of Tithonus, the mortal prince received immortality, but not agelessness, from the gods so when old age came to him he kept aging and shrinking but never dying. In the end his divine lover Eos turned Tithonus into a cicada. In several ancient Greek vases Geras is depicted fighting Heracles, although no relevant written myth survives. Geras is presented as an old, wrinkled bald man begging for mercy.

Philostratus claimed that the people of Gadeira set up altars to Geras and Thanatos.

== Function ==
Geras as embodied in humans represented a virtue: the more gēras a man acquired, the more kleos (fame) and arete (excellence and courage) he was considered to have. In ancient Greek literature, the related word géras (γέρας) can also carry the meaning of influence, authority or power; especially that derived from fame, good looks and strength claimed through success in battle or contest. Such uses of this meaning can be found in Homer's Odyssey, throughout which there is an evident concern from the various kings about the géras they will pass to their sons through their names. The concern is significant because kings at this time (such as Odysseus) are believed to have ruled by common assent in recognition of their powerful influence, rather than hereditarily.

Geras could refer to the treasure that was awarded during battles in Ancient Greece. After a battle, the victorious power would collect the captured gold, treasure, and other valuable artefacts. It would then be divided among the victors according to their timê or honour; the greater the honour, the greater the level of Geras that would be gained.

In Homer's Iliad, Agamemnon and Achilles fall out over a dispute of the return Chryses' daughter and taking Briseis in exchange (Book 1); Achilles sees Agamemnon taking his Gera as an affront to his pride and honour. Similarly, in many Hellenic cultures, it is customary to take the armour of a defeated enemy, a form of Gera, such as in Book 16 with Hector and Patroclus fighting over the body of Cebriones, son of Priam - King of Troy.

== See also ==
- Cumaean Sibyl
- Geras, Mortal Kombat character
- Elli, Norse personification of old age
- Gerascophobia
