= Södermanland Runic Inscription 194 =

Runic inscription

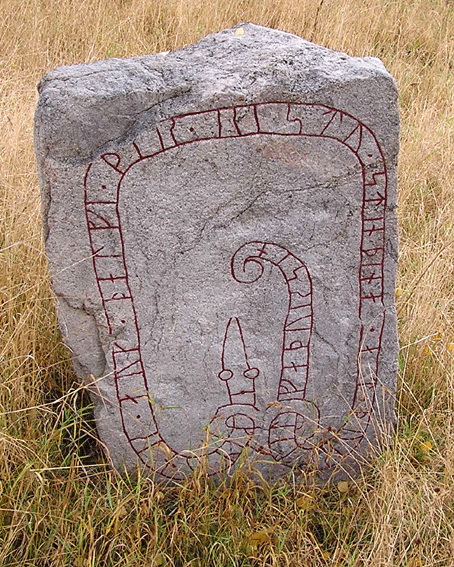
The runestone Sö 194 from Brössike

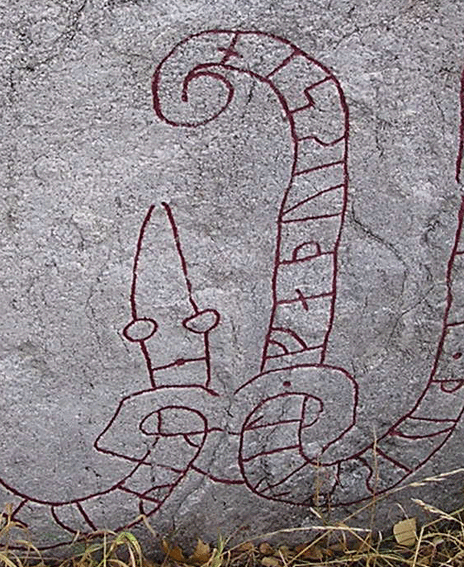
Detail showing the binding of serpent's head and tail, with the runes faþur sin ("their father") carved on the tail

Sö 194 is the Rundata designation for a runic inscription on a memorial runestone located in Brössike, which is about 12 kilometers northeast of Strängnäs, Södermanland County, Sweden, which was in the historic province of Södermanland. There are many such memorial runestones in Scandinavia. While the tradition of carving inscriptions into boulders began in the 4th century and lasted into the 12th century, most runestones date from the late Viking Age.

== Description ==
Carved into a granite boulder that is 1.4 meters (4 ft 7 in) in height, this unsigned inscription has been attributed to the runemaster Balle, who was active during the last half of the eleventh century. The text of the inscription lies within a serpent band, a motif common on many memorial runestones. At the bottom of the inscription, there is a binding around the head and tail of the serpent as if to keep the serpent bound to the surface of the stone. The runestone is classified as being carved in runestone style Fp. This is the classification for inscriptions with runic bands that end with the serpent or animal heads depicted as seen from above.

The runic text states that the stone was raised by two sons named Ingimundr and Þjalfi in memory of their father Þorketill. The Old Norse name Ingimundr means "Tutelage of Youth." Þjalfi means "Digger" or "Delver", and Þjálfi was the name of a servant or follower of the Norse god Thor that is listed in the Prose Edda. The name Þorketil signifies a "Vessel or Kettle of Thor", possibly a type of sacrificial cauldron. The Poetic Edda poem Hymiskviða has a story in which Thor fetches a large cauldron to brew ale.

== Inscription ==
=== Transliteration of the runes into Latin characters ===
ekimunr * auk * þalfi * þir * ristu * stin * þina * at * þurktil * faþur sin

=== Transcription into Old Norse ===
Ingimundr ok Þjalfi þeir reistu stein þenna at Þorketil, fôður sinn.

=== Translation in English ===
Ingimundr and Þjalfi, they raised this stone in memory of Þorketill, their father.
