= Tugger: The Jeep 4x4 Who Wanted to Fly =

- Directed by: Jeffrey J. Varab; Woody Woodman
- Written by: Michael Mullin; Brian Crowder; John Gallacher; Jeffrey J Varab; Woody Woodman
- Produced by: Rose Warner
- Starring: Jim Belushi; Carrot Top; Lance LeGault; Tom Kinney; Peter Renaday; Wendy Cutler; Jason Jackman
- Edited by: N. Eric Phillips; Brian Crowder; Eric Humiston; Chrissie Lavender
- Music by: Greg Sims
- Production company: Genesis Orlando
- Distributed by: Animated Family Films; Eternal Pictures (South Africa); Anchor Bay Entertainment (DVD)
- Release date: March 15, 2005
- Running time: 60 minutes
- Country: United States
- Language: English
- Budget: $2.4 million

Tugger: The Jeep 4x4 Who Wanted to Fly is a 2005 American direct-to-video movie produced by Genesis Orlando. It is about a sentient, anthropomorphic Willys MB named Tugger (voiced by Jim Belushi) who during World War II is damaged during a battle and his motor fan is replaced by an airplane propeller, giving him a dream of one day flying.

== Plot ==
The film opens up to the narrator talking about a Willys MB 4x4 named Tugger who was badly damaged in battle during WWII, whose engine fan was destroyed and replaced with an airplane propeller. After the war, Tugger was put up for sale and was sold to a small airport, where he is closer to his dream to fly like a real plane.

== Voices ==
- Jim Belushi as Tugger
- Carrot Top as Shorty
- Lance LeGault as The Chief
- Peter Renaday as Pa Pump and the narrator
- Wendy Cutler as Ma Pump
- Jason Jackman as Bob
- Bob Papenbrook as BD
- Gary Bosko as Controller
- Newell Alexander as Doc, Crewman 2
- Michael Sorich as Frank
- Bridget Hoffman as Lucy
- Robert Clotworthy as Fatty and USAF Pilot
- Steve Bulen as Towerman and Crewman 3
- Doug Turkel as Stranger
- Tom Kinney as Max

== Release ==
Tugger premiered at a few Carmike Theaters nationwide in 2005, however, Jeffery J. Varab, the director of the film, stated that the film was only test screened. It was later released on DVD by Durand Group the same year and again by Anchor Bay Entertainment in 2008.

== Reception ==
Tugger was not reviewed by many critics, but received mixed reviews from those who did review it. Orlando Sentinel's Roger Moore gave it a 2.5 saying "Tugger: The Jeep Who Wanted to Fly never really takes flight. It's better designed than animated, better voiced than scripted." Asheville, N.C., Mountain Xpress gave it 3 stars calling it boring but with a delightful, crisp, and clever visual.
