= Skrymir (moon) =

Moon of Saturn

Discovery
- Discovered by: Sheppard et al.
- Discovery date: 2019

Designations
- Named after: Skrýmir/Skrymir
- Alternative names: Saturn LVI; S/2004 S 23; S8630a

Orbital characteristics
- Semi-major axis: 21427000 km
- Eccentricity: 0.399
- Orbital period (sidereal): −1164.3 days
- Inclination: 177.7°
- Satellite of: Saturn
- Group: Norse group

Physical characteristics
- Mean diameter: 4 km
- Apparent magnitude: 24.8

Skrymir (Saturn LVI), provisionally known as S/2004 S 23, is a natural satellite of Saturn. Its discovery was announced by Scott S. Sheppard, David C. Jewitt, and Jan Kleyna on October 7, 2019 from observations taken between December 12, 2004 and March 22, 2007. It was given its permanent designation in August 2021. On 24 August 2022, it was officially named after Útgarða-Loki (also known as Skrýmir). He is a jötunn from Norse mythology and master of illusions.

Skrymir is about 4 kilometres in diameter, and orbits Saturn at an average distance of 21.163 million km in 1149.82 days, at an inclination of 177° to the ecliptic, in a retrograde direction and with an eccentricity of 0.373.
