= Anders Bircow =

Danish actor and comedian

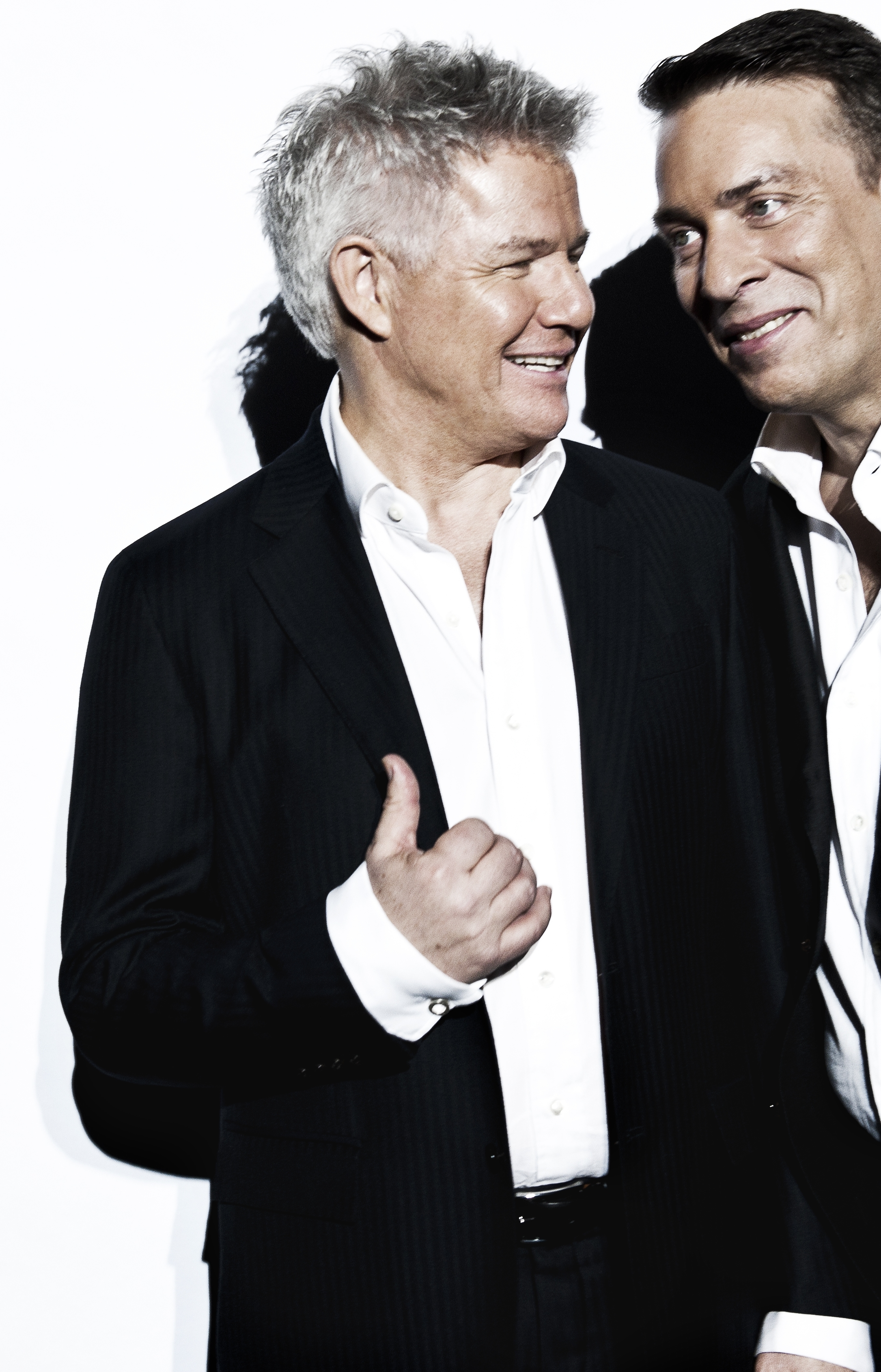
- Anders Bircow in 2011
- Born: 15 December 1951 (age 74); Helsinge, Denmark
- Website: andersbircow.dk

Anders Bircow is a Danish actor and comedian. He is best known as a member of the comedy act Linie 3.

== Early life and education ==
Anders Bircow was born in the town of Helsinge, and attended schools in Nærum, Ramløse and Helsinge. He received an education as a bank worker in Helsinge, and later worked as a school teacher in Vorgod in Herning.

He was trained as an actor at Aarhus Theatre School.

== Career ==
Bircow played guitar and bass in a band called Cokes from the age of 13 until adulthood. He joined Skuespillerskolen (Drama school) at the Århus city’s local theatre. In 1979 he formed the comedy group Linie 3 along with Preben Kristensen, with whom he had previously had the four-man group Barbershop Harmony, and Thomas Eje. Linie 3 premiered their first TV show in 1980.

In 2001 Linie 3 appeared in a millennium show called Rundrejsen 2001 that was seen by more than 300,000 people. Linie 3 had their 25th anniversary-show in 2004. They then broke up for some years and Eje spent time in the US; they reformed in 2011. Their comeback show in April 2012 at the Tivoli Theatre in Copenhagen was a success and was followed by a nationwide tour.

Bircow has also appeared in his own one-man-show, mostly at company and private events. He has directed plays and translated drama and animated cartoons. He has voiced many cartoon characters and is the official voice of Mickey Mouse in Denmark.

== Other activities ==
In addition to acting and entertainment, he was the chief representative of Amway in Denmark for many years. He lodged a successful complaint against a newspaper which characterised this as investment in a pyramid scheme.

== Personal life ==
Bircow married Marion Bircow, and has three daughters.
