= Linie 3 =

Danish musical comedy act

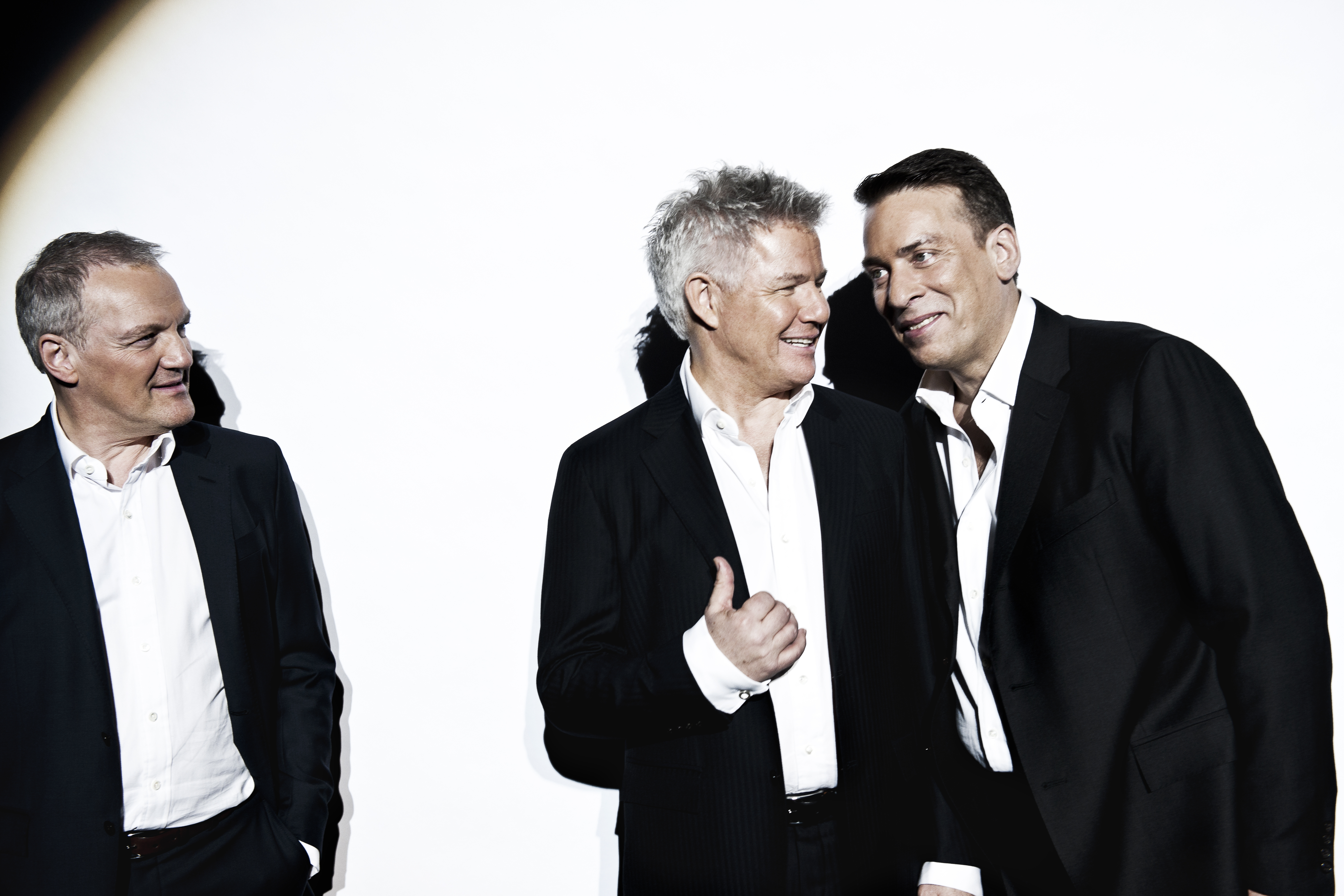
From the 2012 show

Linie 3 is a Danish musical comedy act comprising Preben Kristensen, Thomas Eje and Anders Bircow. The trio first performed in Århus in 1979 and released their first comedy LP in 1980. For their 30th anniversary in 2009, the group released a seven-DVD box.

== Discography and videography ==
- Show for sjov 1979
- TV i Teltet 1980 VHS, reissued DVD
- Nej, den anden 1981 LP
- Da Jazzen Kom Til Byen 1982
- Hvem Hvad Hvoffor og Hvo'n 1982 LP
- Borte med Vesten 1983 LP and MC
- 3 mand klædt af til skindet 1986 LP, MC and reissued 2012 on DVD
- 10 års jubilæumsshow 1989 MC, LP and CD, VHS, reissued on DVD
- Skibet i Skilteskoven 1992 CD, DVD
- Hvor er de 2 andre? 1993 CD, DVD and VHS
- Linie 3 show ’97 1997 CD, DVD
- Rundrejsen 2001 (2001 Tour) CD, DVD
- 25 års jubilæumsshow 2004 DVD
- 30 års jubilæums 2009 no new show - DVD repackaging
- Linie 3 LIVE 2012
