= Thomas Eje =

Danish actor and entertainer

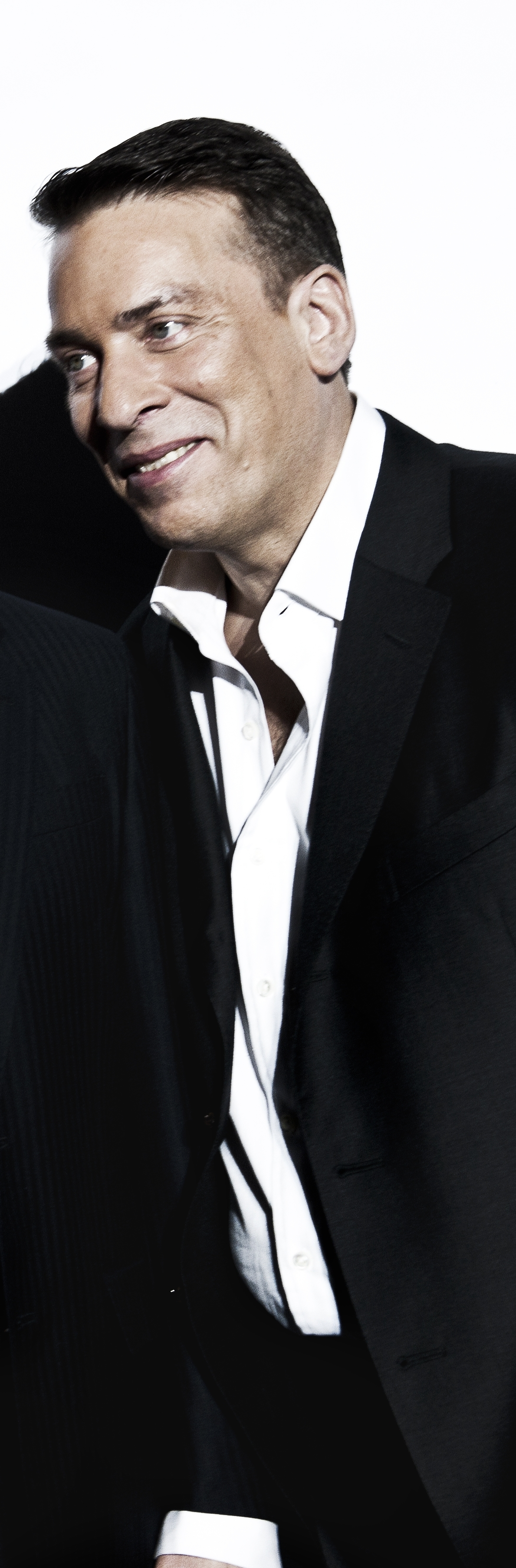
- Thomas Eje in 2011
- Born: 15 March 1957 (age 68); Frederiksberg, Denmark
- Occupation(s): Actor, entertainer
- Website: thomaseje.dk

Thomas Eje (born March 15, 1957) is a Danish actor and entertainer. Considered one of the most popular entertainers in Denmark, he trained at the Odense Conservatory of Music and as an actor at the Aarhus Theatre, and has appeared in musicals and been honored with the Årets Dirch at the annual Danish "Review of Revues", but is best known for his work with comedy trio Linie 3 together with Preben Kristensen and Anders Bircow, as well as for a number of one-man shows. On November 15, 2006 he made his Las Vegas debut at the Suncoast Casino, under the moniker Tom Dane. After four years in Las Vegas he returned to Denmark, and Linie 3 held a successful comeback show followed by a tour. Eje is accredited for his musical talent, being able to play "an impressive number" of different musical instruments.

Eje is married to the English Artist Katherine Scrivens.
