= Jeffrey J. Varab =

Jeffrey James Varab is a leading animator and visual effects artist and one of the pioneers of 3D computer animation. His work on the 1995 film Casper marked the first fully computer-rendered lead character in a feature film, beating Woody and Buzz Lightyear of the fully computer-animated Toy Story by six months.

== Career ==
Originally hired at Disney Animation in 1977, Varab was trained on the film Pete's Dragon by one of "Disney's Nine Old Men", Eric Larson. Classmates at Disney Animation included filmmakers such as Pixar's John Lasseter, Tim Burton and Don Bluth. Since then, Varab has done work for Steven Spielberg's Amblin Entertainment, George Lucas' Industrial Light and Magic, Universal Pictures and Sullivan Bluth Studios. Varab's work has appeared in such films as The Fox and the Hound, All Dogs Go To Heaven, FernGully: The Last Rainforest, We're Back! A Dinosaur's Story, Casper, Balto, Mulan, The Rugrats Movie, Titan AE, and Tugger: The Jeep 4x4 Who Wanted to Fly.

Over the past three years, Varab has been heavily involved in pioneering the use of stereoscopic rendering and autostereoscopy in animation. He is currently in pre-production on a series of feature films that will showcase this technology. He has also been involved in designing tool sets for 2d-3d stereoscopic conversion.

In August 2010, Jeff Varab was charged with 13 counts of fraud and arrested in Osceola County Florida.
