= Útgarða-Loki =

Norse mythical character

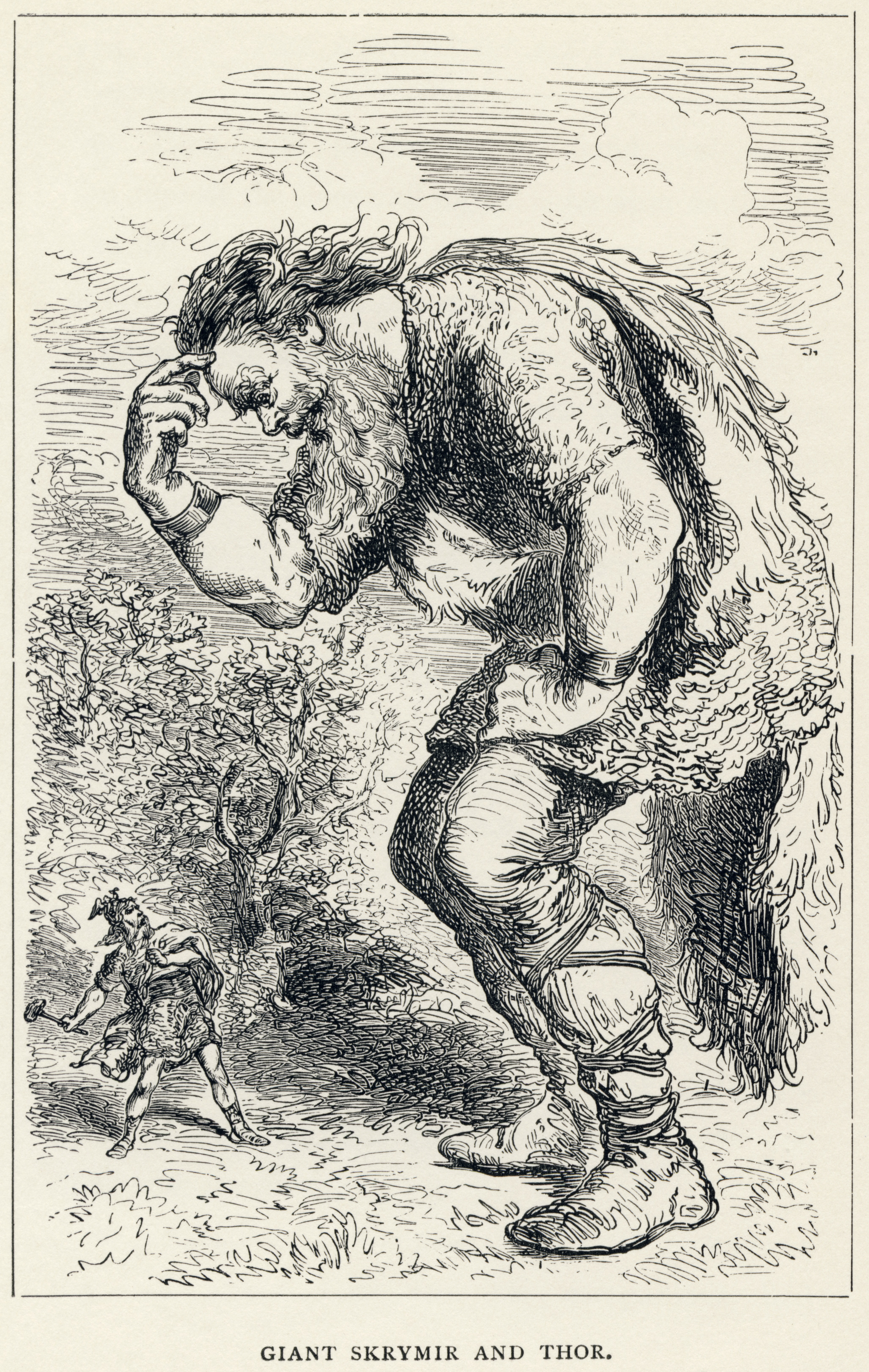
[The] Giant Skrymir and Thor (c. 1891), by Louis Huard.

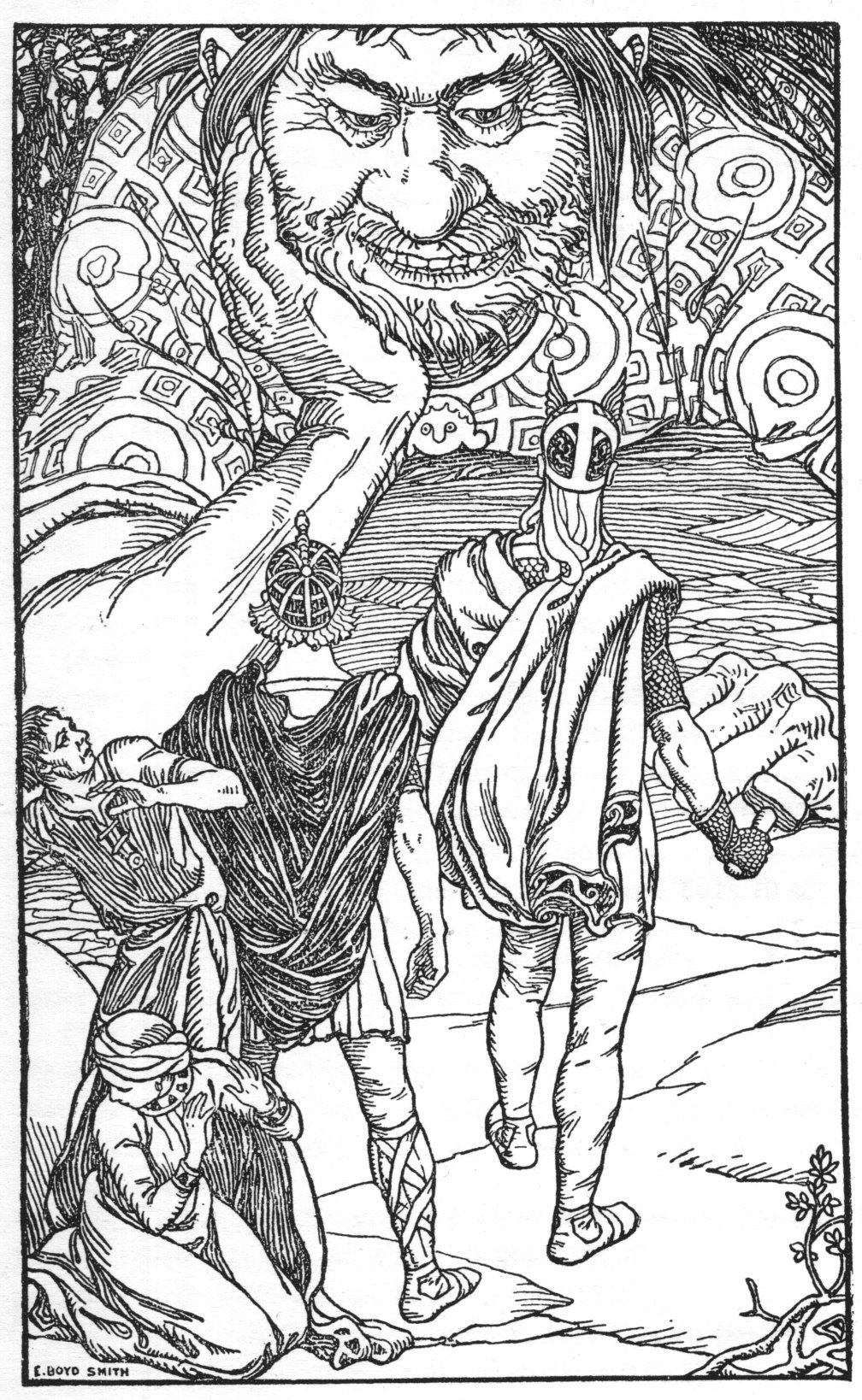
"I am the giant Skrymir" (1902) by Elmer Boyd Smith.

In Norse mythology, Útgarða-Loki (Anglicized as Utgarda-Loki, Utgard-Loki, and Utgardsloki) is the ruler of the castle Útgarðr in Jötunheimr. He is one of the jötnar and his name means literally "Loki of the Outyards" or "Loki of the Outlands", to distinguish him from Loki. He was also known as Skrýmir or Skrymir.

== Prose Edda ==
In the Prose Edda book Gylfaginning (chapter 44), the enthroned figure of Third reluctantly relates a tale in which Thor, Loki and Thor's servants, Þjálfi and Röskva are traveling to the east. They arrive at a vast forest in Jötunheimr, and they continue through the woods until dark. The four seek shelter for the night and discover an immense building. Finding shelter in a side room, they experience earthquakes through the night. The earthquakes cause all four to be fearful, except Thor, who grips his hammer in defense. The building turns out to be the huge glove of Skrýmir, who has been snoring throughout the night, causing what seemed to be earthquakes. The next night, all four sleep beneath an oak tree near Skrýmir in fear.

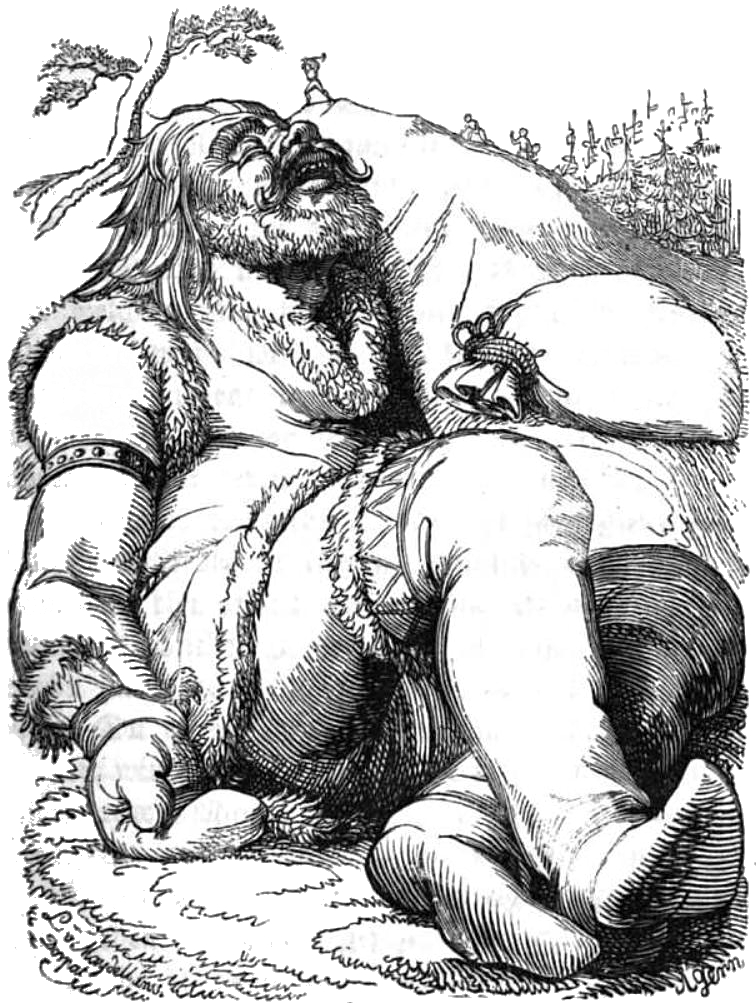
Thor issues blows to the sleeping Skrýmir while the group looks on in an illustration (1842) by Friedrich Ludwig von Maydell.

Thor wakes up in the middle of the night, and a series of events occur where Thor twice attempts to destroy the sleeping Skrýmir with his hammer. Skrýmir awakes after each attempt, only to say that he detected an acorn falling on his head or that he wonders if bits of tree from the branches above have fallen on top of him. After the third attempt, Skrýmir gives them advice; if they are going to be cocky at the castle of Útgarðr it would be better for them to turn back now, for Útgarða-Loki's men there won't put up with it. Skrýmir throws his knapsack onto his back and abruptly goes into the forest and "there is no report that the Æsir expressed hope for a happy reunion".

The four travelers continue their journey until midday. They find themselves facing a massive castle in an open area. The castle is so tall that they must bend their heads back to their spines to see above it. At the entrance to the castle is a shut gate, and Thor finds that he cannot open it. Struggling, all four squeeze through the bars of the gate, and continue to a large hall. Inside the great hall are two benches, where many generally large people sit. The four see Útgarða-Loki, the king of the castle, sitting.

Útgarða-Loki says that no visitors are allowed to stay unless they can perform a feat. Loki, standing in the rear of the party, is the first to speak, claiming that he can eat faster than anyone. Loki competes with a being named Logi to consume a trencher full of meat but loses. Útgarða-Loki asks what feat the "young man" can perform, referring to Þjálfi. Þjálfi says that he will attempt to run a race against whomever Útgarða-Loki choose. Útgarða-Loki says that this would be a fine feat yet that Þjálfi had better be good at running, for he is about to be put to the test. Útgarða-Loki and the group go outside to a level-grounded course.

At the course, Útgarða-Loki calls for a small figure by the name of Hugi to compete with Þjálfi. The first race begins and Þjálfi runs, but Hugi runs to the end of the course and then back again to meet Þjálfi. Útgarða-Loki comments to Þjálfi that he will have to run faster than that, yet notes that he has never seen anyone who has come to his hall run faster than that. Þjálfi and Hugi run a second race. Þjálfi loses by an arrow-shot. Útgarða-Loki comments that Þjálfi has again run a fine race but that he has no confidence that Þjálfi will be able to win a third. A third race between the two commences and Þjálfi again loses to Hugi. Everyone agrees that the contest between Þjálfi and Hugi has been decided.

Thor agrees to compete in a drinking contest but after three immense gulps fails. Thor agrees to lift a large, gray cat in the hall but finds that it arches his back no matter what he does, and that he can only raise a single paw. Thor demands to fight someone in the hall, but the inhabitants say doing so would be demeaning, considering Thor's weakness. Útgarða-Loki then calls for his nurse Elli, an old woman. The two wrestle but the harder Thor struggles the more difficult the battle becomes. Thor is finally brought down to a single knee. Útgarða-Loki said to Thor that fighting anyone else would be pointless. As it is now late at night, Útgarða-Loki shows the group to their rooms and they are treated with hospitality.

The next morning the group gets dressed and prepares to leave the keep. Útgarða-Loki appears, has his servants prepare a table, and they all merrily eat and drink. As they leave, Útgarða-Loki asks Thor how he thought he fared in the contests. Thor says that he is unable to say he did well, noting that he is particularly annoyed that Útgarða-Loki will now speak negatively about him. Útgarða-Loki, once the group has left his keep, points out that he hopes that they never return to it, for if he had had an inkling of what he was dealing with he would never have allowed the group to enter in the first place. Útgarða-Loki reveals that all was not what it seemed to the group. Útgarða-Loki was in fact the immense Skrýmir, and that if the three blows Thor attempted to land had hit their mark, the first would have killed Skrýmir. In reality, Thor's blows were so powerful that they had resulted in three square valleys.

"Nú skal segja þér hit sanna, er þú ert út kominn or borginni, at ef ek lifi ok megak ráða, þá skaltu aldri optarr í hana koma; ok þát veit trúa mín, at aldri hefðir þú í hana komit, ef ek hefða vitat áðr, at þú hefðir svá mikinn krapt með þér, ok þú hafðir svá nær haft oss mikilli ófœru. Enn sjónhverfingar hefi ek gert þér, svá at fyrsta sinn, er ek fann þik á skóginum, kom ek til fundar við yðr; ok þá er þú skyldir leysa nestbaggann, þá hafðak bundit med gresjárni, enn þú fannt eigi, hvar upp skyldi lúka. [...] Enn er þú drakkt af horninu, ok þótti þér seint liða; en þát veit trúa min, at þá varð þat unðr, er ek munda eigi trúa at vera mætti; annarr endir hornsins var út i hafi, enn þat sáttú eigi; enn nú, er þú kemr til sjávarins, þá muntú sjá mega, hvern þurð þú hefir drukkit á sænum; þat eru nú fjörur kallaðar."

"I shall tell you the truth, now you are out of my castle, and if I live and have a say, you shall never enter it again, and I would indeed never have let you in if I had known your strength beforehand, and you were very close to bringing us a great disaster. You see, I cast delusions on you, so that it was I who met you at first in the forest; and when you tried to untie the food bag, I had tied it with a magic wire, and you did not find out how to untie it. [...] And when you drank from the horn and thought it slow to sink, I dare say that was a miracle I had not expected to be possible; the far end of the horn was submerged in the sea, but you did not see that. Now, when you come to the shore, you will see what kind of sip you drank from the sea; there is now a sandy beach where there used to be water."

The contests, too, were an illusion. Útgarða-Loki reveals that Loki had actually competed against wildfire itself (Logi, Old Norse "flame"), Þjálfi had raced against thought (Hugi, Old Norse "thought"), Thor's drinking horn had actually reached to the ocean and with his drinks he lowered the ocean level (resulting in tides). The cat that Thor attempted to lift was in actuality the world serpent, Jörmungandr, and everyone was terrified when Thor was able to lift the paw of this "cat", for Thor had actually held the great serpent up to the sky. The old woman Thor wrestled was in fact Old Age (Elli, Old Norse "old age"), and there is no one whom old age cannot bring down. Útgarða-Loki concludes by telling Thor that it would be better for "both sides" if they did not meet again. Upon hearing this, Thor takes hold of his hammer and swings it at Útgarða-Loki but he disappears and so does his castle. Only a wide landscape remains.

== Gesta Danorum ==
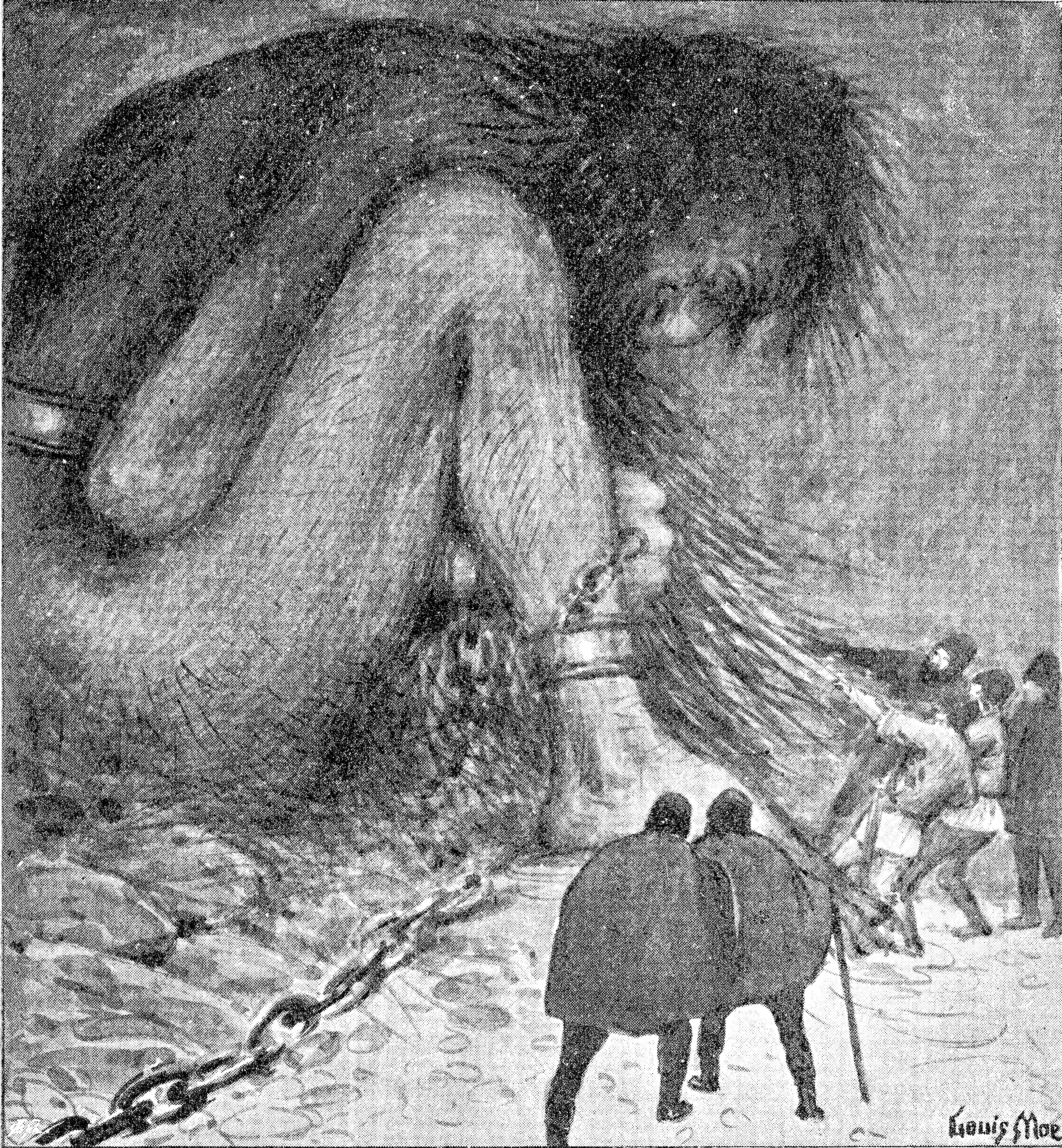
Thorkil in Utgarthilocus' chamber, illustration by Louis Moe (1898)

In Gesta Danorum a ship meets strong winds and sacrifices are made to various gods to obtain favorable weather, including to one called Utgarthilocus. With vows and propitiations to him a beneficial spell of weather is obtained. Later an expedition to the land of the giants comes upon this figure.

Ex qua item atrum obscenumque conclave visentibus aperitur. Intra quod Utgarthilocus manus pedesque immensis catenarum molibus oneratus aspicitur, cuius olentes pili tam magnitudine quam rigore corneas aequaverant hastas. Quorum unum Thorkillus, adnitentibus sociis, mento patientis excussum, quo promptior fides suis haberetur operibus, asservavit; statimque tanta foetoris vis ad circumstantes manavit, ut nisi repressis amiculo naribus respirare nequirent.

From here the visitors could see a murky, repulsive chamber, inside which they descried Utgartha-Loki, his hands and feet laden with a huge weight of fetters. His rank-smelling hairs were as long and tough as spears of cornel-wood. Thorkil kept one of these as a more visible proof of his labours by heaving at it with his friends till it was plucked from the chin of the unresisting figure; immediately such a powerful stench rolled over the bystanders that they had to smother their nostrils in their cloaks and could scarcely breathe.

As a proof of their accomplishments, the men bring back a hair pulled from the giant's beard, stinking so harshly that several men drop dead on smelling it.

Apart from the name of the giant there is little that reminds of Snorri's Útgarða-Loki. The bound giant figure is more reminiscent of the bound Loki who likewise lies chained and tortured in a cave. Gabriel Turville-Petre notes that "Utgardilocus appears to be Loki, expelled from Ásgarð into Útgarð" and expresses an opinion that "Snorri appears to be retelling a folktale, which has changed from the original myth in which Útgarðaloki must have been Loki himself".

== Popular culture ==
The Danish animated film Valhalla (Peter Madsen and others, 1984) is based on the Útgarða-Loki story from the Prose Edda. Útgarða-Loki serves as the villain and Elli is described as his mother.

In the Marvel Comics continuity, Utgard-Loki is an enemy of Thor. While originally depicted as a leader of frost giants, The Immortal Thor revealed him to be named after the true Utgard-Loki, who takes the form of Skrymir.

Utgarda-Loki also makes an appearance as the final boss in the video game Ragnarok Odyssey.

Skrymir also appears in the Buffy the Vampire Slayer novel Spike and Dru: Pretty Maids All In A Row.

Utgard-Loki appears as a supporting character in Rick Riordan's Magnus Chase and the Gods of Asgard series. He is stated to be king of the mountain giants and the most powerful sorcerer in Jotunheim.

In Thomas Hardy's 1884 short story, Interlopers at the Knapp, a breeze 'brought a snore from the wood as if Skrymir the Giant were sleeping there'. The short story appears in Hardy's short story collection, Wessex Tales.

Saturn's moon Skrymir is named after him.
