= Preben Kristensen =

Danish actor (born 1953)

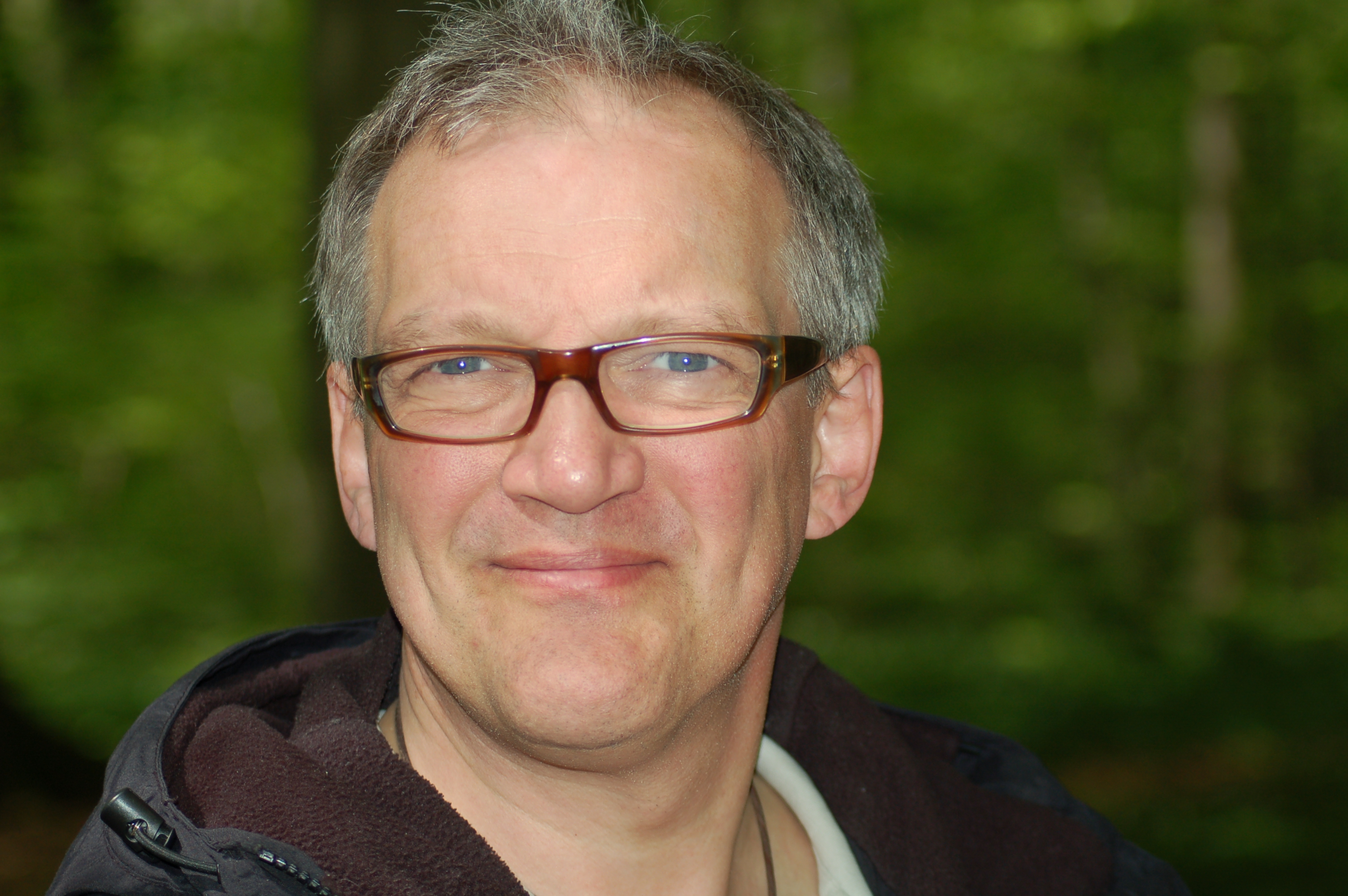
- Preben Kristensen in 2008
- Born: Skive, Denmark
- Occupation: Actor

Preben Kristensen is a Danish actor. He first came to attention as one of the musical comedy trio Linie 3 in 1979.

== Early life and education ==
Preben Kristensen was born in Skive, Denmark.

He was educated from the drama school of Aarhus Theatre in 1978.

== Career ==
Kristensen has starred in shows and plays including roles like Tony in West Side Story, King Claudius in William Shakespeare's Hamlet, McMurphy in One Flew Over the Cuckoo's Nest, George in Who's Afraid of Virginia Woolf?, Arnold in Torch Song Trilogy, Albin in La Cage Aux Folles, Phantom in Lloyd Webber's The Phantom of the Opera, and Max Bialystok in Mel Brooks's musical comedy The Producers. In 1979 he created the musical and comedy group Linie 3 together with Thomas Eje and Anders Bircow. He has performed with the best symphony orchestras in Denmark.

Kristensen is the localized Danish voice of Lumiere in Disney's Beauty and the Beast, Genie in Disney's Aladdin, Berkeley Beetle in Don Bluth's Thumbelina, Woody in Toy Story 1, 2, 3 and 4, and Ramon in Happy Feet and Happy Feet Two.

On television, Kristensen was one of the main characters in season two of The Killing and also appeared in the final season of Borgen.

Kristensen has received several awards for his acting, and was in 2003 knighted by Margrethe II of Denmark.
