= Elli =

Norse personification of old age

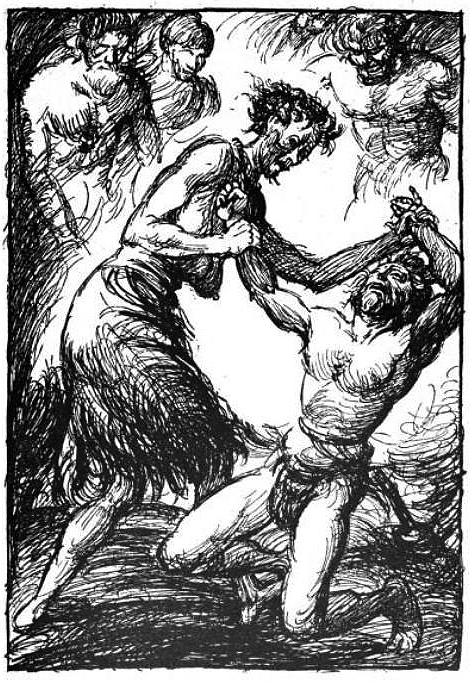
A depiction of Elli wrestling Thor (1919) by Robert Engels.

In Norse mythology (a subset of Germanic mythology), Elli (Old Norse: [ˈelːe], "old age") is a personification of old age who, in the Prose Edda book Gylfaginning, defeats Thor in a wrestling match.

== Gylfaginning ==
In Gylfaginning, Thor and his companions Loki and Þjálfi are in the hall of the jötunn Útgarða-Loki where they meet difficult challenges testing their strength and skill. Thor has just been humiliated in a drinking challenge and wants to get even.

Then said Thor: 'Little as ye call me, let any one come up now and wrestle with me; now I am angry.' Then Útgarda-Loki answered, looking about him on the benches, and spake: 'I see no such man here within, who would not hold it a disgrace to wrestle with thee;' and yet he said: 'Let us see first; let the old woman my nurse be called hither, Elli, and let Thor wrestle with her if he will. She has thrown such men as have seemed to me no less strong than Thor.' Straightway there came into the hall an old woman, stricken in years. Then Útgarda-Loki said that she should grapple with Ása-Thor. There is no need to make a long matter of it: that struggle went in such wise that the harder Thor strove in gripping, the faster she stood; then the old woman attempted a hold, and then Thor became totty on his feet, and their tuggings were very hard. Yet it was not long before Thor fell to his knee, on one foot. Then Útgarda-Loki went up and bade them cease the wrestling, saying that Thor should not need to challenge more men of his body-guard to wrestling.

Later, when Thor and his company are safely out of Útgarða-Loki's hall the jötunn explains that Thor's opponent was much more formidable than she appeared to be and that Thor's prowess was, in fact, astonishing.

It was also a great marvel concerning the wrestling-match, when thou didst withstand so long; and didst not fall more than on one knee, wrestling with Elli; since none such has ever been and none shall be, if he become so old as to abide "Old Age," that she shall not cause him to fall.

Elli is not mentioned in any other extant source but the notion that not even the gods are immune to the effects of aging is supported by the fact that they must consume the apples of Iðunn regularly to stay young.

== See also ==
- Geras, Greek personification of old age
