= Peter Madsen (cartoonist) =

Danish artist

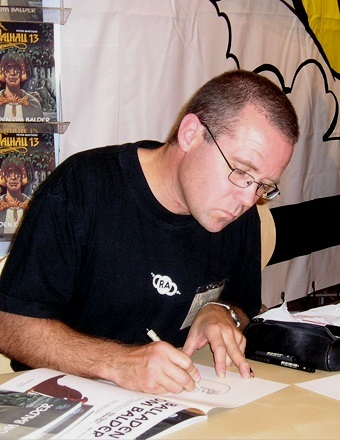
Peter Madsen.

Peter Madsen (born 12 May 1958) is a Danish cartoonist, illustrator, and author. Along with editor Henning Kure and fellow cartoonist Rune T. Kidde he was one of leading forces behind the revival of the Danish cartoon tradition in the 1970s.

He is known for being the illustrator and co-author of the Valhalla comics, a 15-album series detailing Norse mythology published from 1979 to 2009. The series was made into the 1986 animated Valhalla film, which Madsen co-directed. In 1995, he illustrated the Menneskesønnen (the Son of Man) comic, detailing the life of Jesus.

He has received working grants from the Danish Arts Agency and Danish Arts Council.

== Awards ==
- 1981 Danish Union of School Libraries' children's book award, for Valhalla - Ulven er løs
- 1986 Cannes Junior, for Valhalla (film)
- 1989 Ping Award
- 1990 Best drawn Danish album, for Grønlandsk dagbog
- 1991 Best Danish album, best drawn Danish album, and best colored Danish album, for Valhalla - Ormen i dybet
- 1992 Norwegian Sproing Award for best foreign album, Valhalla - Frejas smykke
- 1995 Best colored Danish album, for Menneskesønnen
- 1996 Angoulême International Comics Festival Christian Comic Award, for Menneskesønnen
- 1999 SAS Best Nordic album award, for Valhalla - Mysteriet om digtermjøden
- 2003 Norwegian Sproing Award for best foreign album, Menneskesønnen
