= Útgarðar =

Norse mythology stronghold of the giants

In Norse mythology, Útgarðar (literally: "Outyards", plural of Útgarðr; anglicized as Utgard, Utgardar and in other ways) were areas which surrounded a stronghold of the jötnar. They are associated with Útgarða-Loki, a great and devious jotunn featured in one of the myths concerning Thor and the other Loki, who competed in rigged competitions held in the Outyards. These outdoor arenas contrasted with the putrid, indoor cave where Útgarða-Loki is said to have dwelt, when chained, in the 12th-century Gesta Danorum.

In another version of Norse mythology, Utgard is thought to be the last of the three worlds connected to Yggdrasil, being the home of the external cosmic forces. Utgard needs to be compared with the Midgard, the world of human affairs, and Asgard, variously attested at the crux of the matter, the centre of the world, as identified with Troy by Snorri Sturluson.
