= Gertrude (given name) =

- Pronunciation: /ˈɡɜːrtruːd/
- Gender: Female

Origin
- Origin: Germanic
- Meaning: derived from words meaning "spear" and "strength"

Other names
- Related names: Gertrud, Gjertrud, Gertraud, Geertruida, Geltrude, Gertrudis, Gertrudes, Kerttu, Gertruda, Geirþrúður, Trude, Gerda, Kärt

Gertrude (also spelled Gertrud) is a feminine given name which is derived from Germanic roots that meant "spear" and "strength". "Trudy", originally a diminutive of "Gertrude", has developed into a name in its own right.

In German-speaking countries, Gertraud (pronounced Ger-trowt) is a familiar variation of the name.

"Gartred" is a rare variation (attested in Daphne du Maurier's novel The King's General, set in 17th-century Cornwall, England).

"Gertruda" is a rare variation used in the Soviet Union (see Names of Soviet origin) as an abbreviation of Geroy truda (the Hero of Labour).

== People ==
=== Medieval women without surnames ===
- Gertrude of Aldenberg (1227–1297), daughter of Saint Elizabeth of Thuringia and abbess near Trier
- Gertrude of Austria (1226–1288), Duchess of Austria and Styria
- Gertrude of Babenberg, Duchess of Bohemia (c. 1118–1150)
- Gertrude of Baden (c. 1160–1225), Margravine of Baden
- Gertrude of Bavaria (died 1197), daughter of Henry the Lion, Queen consort of Denmark
- Gertrude of Brunswick (c. 1060–1117), Margravine of Frisia and Meissen
- Gertrude of Comburg (died 1130), Queen consort of Germany
- Gertrude of Dagsburg (died 1225), Duchess of Lorraine
- Gertrude of Delft (died 1358), Dutch Beguine and mystic
- Gertrude of Flanders, Countess of Savoy (1135–1186)
- Gertrude of Flanders, Duchess of Lorraine (c. 1070–1117)
- Gertrude the Great (1256–c. 1302), also known as Gertrude of Helfta, German Benedictine nun, mystic and theologian, considered a Roman Catholic saint though never officially canonized
- Gertrude of Hackeborn (1223–1292), Abbess of Helfta
- Gertrude of Hamage (died 649), saint, founder of the convent Hamage
- Gertrude of Hohenberg (c. 1225–1281), Queen consort of Germany
- Gertrude of Merania (1185–1213), Queen consort and regent of Hungary
- Gertrude of Nivelles (c. 628–659), Catholic and Eastern Orthodox saint, abbess and co-founder of the Abbey of Nivelles
- Gertrude of Poland (c. 1025–1108), Grand Princess Consort of Kiev
- Gertrude of Saxony or Gertrude of Holland (ca.1030-1113), wife of Robert I of Flanders, regent of Holland
- Gertrude of Sulzbach (c. 1110–1146), Queen consort of Germany
- Gertrude of Süpplingenburg (1115–1143), Duchess of Bavaria and Saxony

=== A ===
- Gertrude Abercrombie (1909–1977), American painter based in Chicago
- Gertrud Adelborg (1853–1942), Swedish suffragist
- Gertrud Ahlgren (1782–1874), Swedish folk healer
- Gertrude Alderfer (1931–2018), American baseball player
- Gertrude Ansell (1861–1932), British suffragette, animal rights activist and businesswoman
- Gertrude Appleyard (1865–1917), British archer
- Gertrude Aretz (1889–1938), German historian and publisher
- Gertrude Astor (1887–1977), American motion-picture character actress
- Gertrude Atherton (1857–1948), American writer
- Gertrude Aubauer (born 1951), Austrian journalist and politician
- Gertraud Auinger-Oberzaucher (born 1971), Austrian politician

=== B ===
- Gertrud Bacher (born 1971), retired Italian heptathlete
- Gertrude Bacon (1874–1948), aeronautical pioneer and writer with contributions in astronomy and botany
- Gertrud Baer (1890–1981), one of the founders of the Women's International League for Peace and Freedom
- Gertrude Bambrick (1897–1974), American silent-film actress
- Gertrude Baniszewski (1929–1990), American murderer
- Gertrud Bäumer (1873–1954), German politician and feminist
- Gertrude Bell, (1868–1926), archaeologist and spy
- Gertrude Barrows Bennett (1883–1948), American writer of fantasy and science fiction
- Gertrude Berg (1894–1966), American actress and screenwriter
- Gertrude Bernard (1906–1986), Mohawk woman and companion of Grey Owl
- Gertrud Bing (1892–1964), German scholar and director of the Warburg Institute
- Gertrude Blanch (1897–1996), American mathematician
- Gertrude Bloede (1845–1905), American poet
- Gertrude Blom (1901–1993), Swiss journalist, social anthropologist and documentary photographer
- Gertrude Elizabeth Blood (1857–1911), Irish-born journalist, author, playwright, and editor
- Gertrude Bonnin (1876–1938), Sioux writer, editor, musician, teacher and political activist
- Gertrud Bürgers-Laurenz (1874–1959), German flower and portrait painter
- Gertrude Bryan (1888–1976), stage actress on Broadway

=== C ===
- Gertrude Caton Thompson (1888–1985), English archaeologist
- Gertrude Chataway (1866–1951), child-friend of English author Lewis Carroll
- Gertrude Chibagu, Zimbabwean politician
- Gertrude Claire (1852–1928), American stage and silent-film actress
- Gertrud Cohn (1876–1942), German victim of the Nazi regime
- Gertrude Colburn (1886–1968), American dancer and sculptor
- Gertrude Cosgrove (1882–1962), wife of Sir Robert Cosgrove, twice elected as Premier of Tasmania
- Gertrude Courtenay, Marchioness of Exeter (before 1504–1558), a lady at the court of Henry VIII of England
- Gertrude Mary Cox (1900–1978), American statistician
- Gertrude Crain (1911–1996), American publishing executive
- Gertrude Crampton (1909–1996), American children's writer and teacher
- Gertrude Crocker (1884–1969), American suffragist

=== D ===
- Gertrude Degenhardt (1940–2025), German lithographer and illustrator
- Gertrude Denman, Baroness Denman (1884–1954), British women's rights activist
- Gertrud Hedwig Anna Dohm (1855–1942), German actress
- Gertrud Dorka (1893–1976), German archaeologist, prehistorian and museum director
- Gertrude Dunn (1933–2004), American baseball player

=== E ===
- Gertrude Eastmond (died 2024), Barbadian businesswoman and politician
- Gertrude Ederle (1905–2003), American competitive swimmer
- Gertrude B. Elion (1918–1999), American biochemist and pharmacologist
- Gertrude Elles (1872–1960), British geologist

=== F ===
- Gertrude Falk (1925–2008), American physiologist
- Gertrude Franklin (1858–1913), American singer and music educator
- Gertrud Fridh (1921–1984), Swedish stage and film actress

=== G ===
- Gertrude Gabl (1948–1976), Austrian alpine skier
- Gertrude Grob-Prandl (1917–1995), Austrian opera singer
- Gertraud Gruber (1921–2022), German beautician and businesswoman
- Gertrud Grunow (1870–1944), first woman teacher at the Bauhaus art school

=== H ===
- Gertrud Hanna (1876–1944), German activist and politician
- Gertrude Healy (1894–1984), Australian violinist, educator
- Gertrude Himmelfarb (1922–2019), American historian
- Gertrud von Hindenburg (1860–1921), German noblewoman and wife of Paul von Hindenburg

=== J ===
- Gertrude Jekyll (1843–1932), British horticulturist, garden designer, artist, and writer
- Gertraud Junge (1920–2002), Adolf Hitler's last private secretary

=== K ===
- Gertrude Kleinová (1918–1976), Czech three-time table tennis world champion
- Gertrud Koch (1924–2016), German resistance fighter
- Gertrud Kolmar (1894–1943), German lyric poet and writer
- Gertrude Koskoff (1911–1992), American politician
- Gertrud Kraus (1901–1977), Israeli pioneer of modern dance
- Gertrude Kuh (1893–1977), American landscape architect

=== L ===
- Gertrude Lane (died 1953), American trade unionist
- Gertrude Battles Lane (1874–1941), American magazine editor
- Gertrude Lawrence (1898–1952), born Gertrude Alice Dagmar Klasen, English actress, singer, dancer and performer
- Gertrud Leutenegger (1948–2025), German-speaking Swiss writer
- Gertrude Rachel Levy (1884–1966), author and cultural historian
- Gertrude Golda Lowy (1887–1982), English suffragette
- Gertrud Luckner (1900–1995), German Christian resister against Nazism

=== M ===
- Gertrud Månsson (1866–1935), Swedish politician, first woman on the Stockholm city council
- Gertrud Elisabeth Mara (1749–1833), German operatic soprano
- Gertrude Massey (1868–1957), English painter and watercolourist
- Gertrude Massingham (1887–1963), British suffragette and animal welfare advocate
- Frances Gertrude McGill (1882–1959), pioneering Canadian forensic pathologist and criminologist
- Gertrude Mongella (born 1945), Tanzanian politician
- Gertrude Morgan (1900–1980), African-American artist, musician, poet and preacher
- Gertrude Comfort Morrow (c. 1888–1983), American architect
- Gertrude Mwanyanje, Kenyan politician

=== N ===
- Gertrude Nafe (1883–1971), American teacher, essayist, and communist short-story writer
- Gertrude Neumark (1927–2010), American physicist

=== O ===
- Gertrud Orff (1914–2000), one of the first German music therapists
- Gertrud Otto (1895–1970), German art historian
- Gertrude Clare Owens (1887–1963), Superior General of the Sisters of Providence of Saint Mary-of-the-Woods, Indiana

=== P ===
- Gertrud Pätsch (1910–1994), German ethnologist and philologist
- Gertrud Pålson-Wettergren (1897–1991), Swedish mezzo-soprano
- Gertrude Penhall (1846–1929), American civic leader and clubwoman
- Gertrud von Puttkamer (1881–1944), German erotic writer

=== R ===
- Gertrude Pridgett Rainey (1882–1939), better known as Ma Rainey, blues singer
- Gertrud Rask (1673–1735), first wife of the Danish-Norwegian missionary to Greenland, Hans Egede
- Gertrud Rittmann (1908–2005), German composer and music arranger in the United States

=== S ===
- Gertrude Sawyer (1895–1996), American architect
- Gertrude Scharff Goldhaber (1911–1998), German-born Jewish-American nuclear physicist
- Gertrud Schoenberg (1898–1967), second wife of Austrian composer Arnold Schoenberg
- Gertrud Scholtz-Klink (1902–1999), fervent Nazi Party (NSDAP) member in Nazi Germany
- Gertrud Schüpbach (born 1950), Swiss-American molecular biologist
- Gertrud Seidmann (1919–2013), Austrian-British linguist and jewelry historian
- Gertrud Skomagers (died 1556), Danish alleged witch
- Gertrude Stanton (1863–1931), American optometrist
- Gertrúd Stefanek (born 1959), Hungarian Olympic fencer
- Gertrude Stein (1874–1946), American novelist, poet, playwright, and art collector
- Gertrude Story (1929–2014), Canadian writer and radio broadcaster
- Gertrude Strohm (1843–1927), American author, compiler, game designer
- Gertrud Szabolcsi (1923–1993), Hungarian biochemist

=== T ===
- Gertrude Townend, British nurse and suffragette

=== U ===
- Trude Unruh (1925–2021), German politician

=== V ===
- Gertrude Vachon (1962–2010), better known as Luna Vachon, American professional wrestler
- Gertrude Vaile (1878–1954), American social worker
- Gertrude Vakar (1904–1973), Russian translator

=== W ===
- Gertrude Wagner (1907–1992), Austrian sociologist, economist and socialist
- Gertrude Chandler Warner (1890–1979), American children's author
- Gertrude Vanderbilt Whitney (1875–1942), American sculptor, art patron and collector
- Gertrude Walton Donahey (1908–2004), American politician
- Gertrude Weil (1879–1971), American activist in women's suffrage, labor reform, and civil rights
- Gertraud Winkelvoss (1917–1981), German neo-Nazi politician
- Gertrud Wolle (1891–1952), German film actress
- Gertrude Wood (1897–1998), American politician

== Fictional characters ==
- Gertrude, from William Shakespeare's play Hamlet, is Hamlet's mother and Queen of Denmark
- Gertrud Barkhorn, from the anime/manga series Strike Witches
- Gertrude Gadwall, a member of Disney's Duck family

== See also ==
- Gertrude (disambiguation), for a list of fictional characters and people known by only one name
- Gertrudis
- Geertruida
