= Þrúðr =

Norse mythological figure

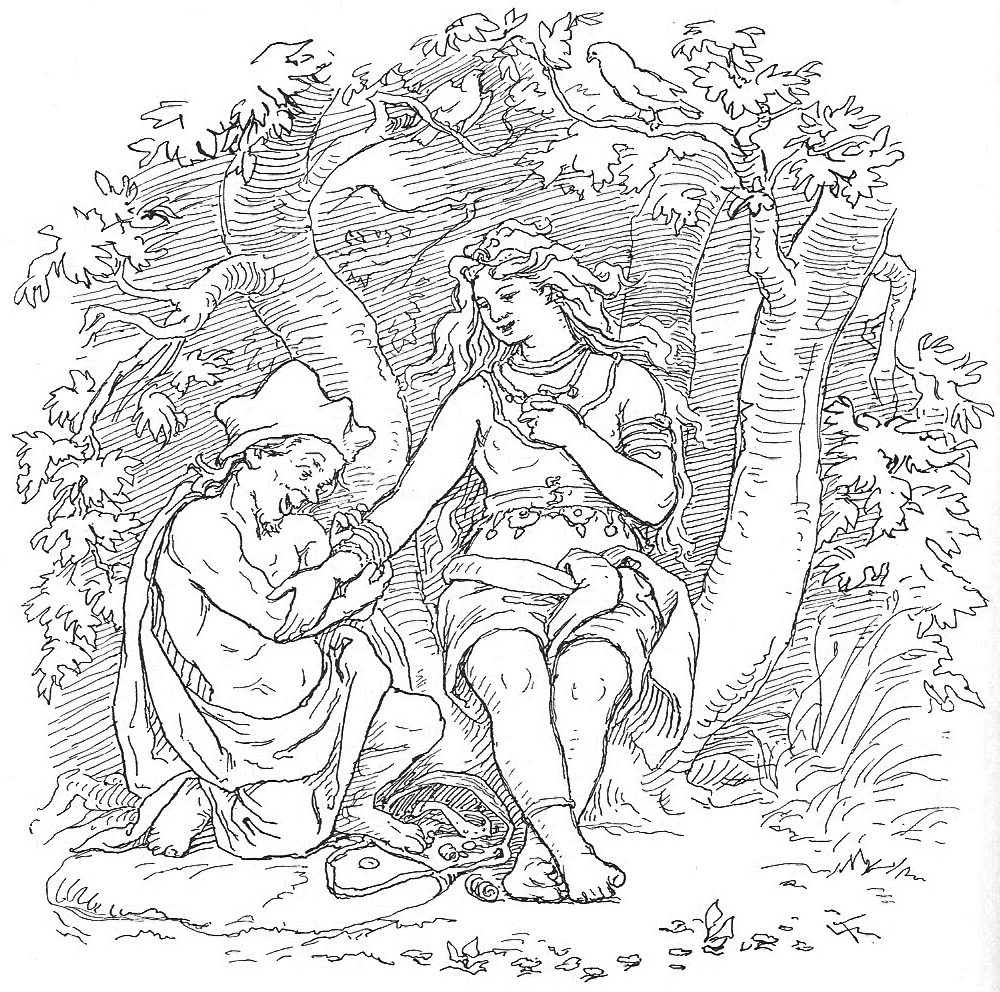
Alvíss and Þrúðr, illustration by Lorenz Frølich

Þrúðr (Old Norse: "strength"), sometimes anglicized as Thrud, is a daughter of the god Thor and the goddess Sif in Norse mythology. Þrúðr is also the name of one of the valkyries who serve ale to the einherjar in Valhalla (Grímnismál, stanza 36). The two may or may not be the same figure.

== Attestations ==
Þrúðr is attested in the following sources:

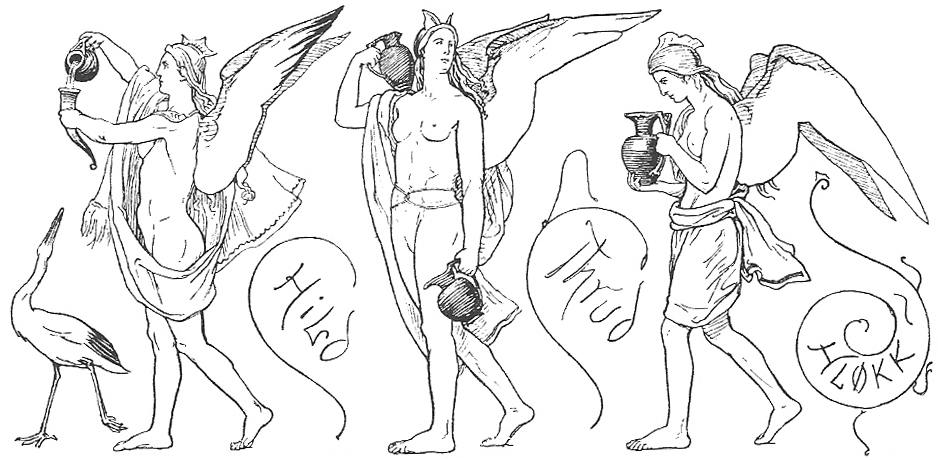
The valkyries Hildr, Þrúðr and Hlökk bearing ale in Valhalla (1895) by Lorenz Frølich.

=== Poetic Edda ===
The Poetic Edda poem Alvíssmál, in which a dwarf, Alvíss, claims to be engaged to Thor's daughter, may be about Þrúðr, but the daughter is not named.

In the poem Grímnismál, Odin (disguised as Grímnir), tortured, starved and thirsty, tells the young Agnar that he wishes that the valkyries Hrist ("shaker") and Mist ("cloud") would "bear him a [drinking] horn", then provides a list of 11 more valkyries who he says "bear ale to the einherjar"; Skeggjöld ("axe-age"), Skögul, Hildr, Þrúðr ("power"), Hlökk ("noise", or "battle"), Herfjötur ("host-fetter"), Göll ("tumult"), Geirahöð ("spear-fight"), Randgríð ("shield-truce"), Ráðgríð ("council-truce") and Reginleif ("power-truce").

=== Prose Edda ===
The Prose Edda book Skáldskaparmál (4) tells that Thor can be referred to by the kenning "father of Þrúðr" (faðir Þrúðar). Eysteinn Valdason uses it in his poem about Thor (2). The Skáldskaparmál (21) adds that her mother is Sif.

In Bragi Boddason's Ragnarsdrápa, the jötunn Hrungnir is called "thief of Þrúðr" (Þrúðar þjófr). But there is no direct reference to this myth in any other source. Skáldskaparmál (17), in which Snorri relates the fight between Thor and Hrungnir, mentions a very different cause, and Þjóðólfr of Hvinir's Haustlöng only describes the fight without giving the reason for it. This poem depicts two mythological scenes painted on a shield, the first being Iðunn's abduction by the giant Þjazi. Margaret Clunies Ross suggested that the two episodes might be complementary, both dealing with the abduction of a goddess by a giant, its failure and the death of the abductor. Another kenning may allude to this myth: in Eilífr Goðrúnarson's Þórsdrápa (18), Thor is called "he who longs fiercely for Þrúðr" (þrámóðnir Þrúðar).

=== Karlevi Runestone ===
Þrúðr is mentioned on the 10th-century Karlevi runestone on the island of Öland, Sweden, where a chieftain is referred to as the "tree of Þrúðr".

== Kennings ==
The name Þrúðr could be used in kennings for chieftains, as exemplified on the Karlevi Runestone. The name is also used in kennings for women. For instance, Ormr Steinþórsson in his poem about a woman (4) uses the kenning hrosta lúðrs gæi-Þrúðr, which, according to Anthony Faulkes, can be rendered "keeper of the malt-box (mash-tub) or ale-vessel".

== See also ==
- Þrúðvangr, the field of Thor
- Torunn, the daughter of Thor in the Marvel Comics universe
- Drude
- Trude
- Trudy
- Alvíss
