= Gertrude =

Gertrude or Gertrud may refer to:

== Arts and entertainment ==
- Gertrud (play), a 1906 Swedish play by Hjalmar Söderberg
  - Gertrud (film), 1964 Danish film based on Söderberg's play
- Gertrud (novel), by Hermann Hesse
- Gertrude Contemporary, an art gallery and studio complex in Melbourne, Australia

== People ==
- Gertrude (given name), a given name, including a list of people and fictional characters with the name

== Places ==
- Gertrude, West Virginia, United States, a ghost town
- Gertrude Island, Washington, United States
- Gertrude (crater), on Uranus's moon Titania
- 710 Gertrud, an asteroid

== Ships ==
- Alice Gertrude (1898–1907), an American steamship
- Gertrude (1841–1845), a ship chartered by the New Zealand Company
- Gertrude (1843–1864), a brig that operated in Australia
- Gertrude L. Thebaud (1930–1948), an American fishing and racing schooner
- HM Hired armed schooner Gertrude (lost 1804), a hired schooner that served in the Royal Navy in 1804
- TSS Gertrude (1905–1962), a British passenger steamship
- USS Gertrude (1862–1880), a British steamship captured by the United States Navy and pressed into service as a gunboat during the American Civil War

== Other uses ==
- Gertrude (code name), an invasion plan for Turkey by Nazi Germany
- Gertrude, an underwater telephone used by submarines for communication
- .Gertrude, an Esoteric programming language

== See also ==
- Trudy
