= Trolls in Middle-earth =

Evil race from J. R. R. Tolkien's legendarium

Trolls
- Middle-earth race
- "The Three Trolls are turned to Stone" (detail) by J.R.R. Tolkien, in some editions of The Hobbit.
- First appearance: The Hobbit
- Created by: J.R.R. Tolkien

In-universe information
- Other names: Torog (Sindarin); Olog-hai (Black Speech)
- Created by: Morgoth
- Creation date: First Age
- Home world: Middle-earth
- Language: Westron; Black Speech
- Notable members: Bert; Tom; William Huggins

Trolls are fictional characters in J. R. R. Tolkien's Middle-earth, and feature in films and games adapted from his novels. They are portrayed as monstrously large humanoids of great strength and poor intellect. In The Hobbit, like the dwarf Alviss of Norse mythology, they must be below ground before dawn or turn to stone, whereas in The Lord of the Rings they are able to face daylight.

Commentators have noted the different uses Tolkien made of trolls, from comedy in Sam Gamgee's poem and the Cockney accents and table manners of the working-class trolls in The Hobbit, to the hellish atmosphere in Moria as the protagonists are confronted by darkness and monsters. Tolkien, a Roman Catholic, drew back from giving trolls the power of speech, as he had done in The Hobbit, as it implied to him that they had souls and thereby confronting him with a moral dilemma, so he made the trolls in The Silmarillion and The Lord of the Rings darker and more bestial. They were supposedly bred by the Dark Lords Melkor and Sauron for their own evil purposes in mockery of ents, helping to express Tolkien's combination of "fairy tale with epic, ... bonded with the Christian mythos".

== Appearances ==
=== The Hobbit ===
"Mutton yesterday, mutton today, and blimey, if it don't look like mutton again tomorrer", said one of the trolls. "Never a blinking bit of manflesh have we had for long enough", said a second.

— from "Roast Mutton" in The Hobbit (Note: Tolkien 1937, ch. 2 "Roast Mutton")

In The Hobbit, Bilbo Baggins and the Dwarf company encountered three stone trolls on their journey to Erebor. The stone trolls captured the Dwarves and prepared to eat them, but the wizard Gandalf managed to distract them until dawn, when exposure to sunlight turned them to stone. They had vulgar table manners, constantly argued and fought amongst themselves, in Tolkien's narrator's words "not drawing-room fashion at all, at all", spoke with Cockney accents, and had matching English working-class names: Tom, Bert, and William. Jennifer Eastman Attebery, a scholar of English, states that the stone trolls in The Hobbit "signify the uncouth".

=== The Lord of the Rings ===
'My lad,' said Troll, 'this bone I stole.
But what be bones that lie in a hole?
Thy nuncle was dead as a lump o' lead,
Afore I found his shinbone.
Tinbone! Skinbone!
He can spare a share for a poor old troll,
For he don't need his shinbone.'

— from "The Stone Troll" in The Fellowship of the Ring (Note: Tolkien 1954a, book 1, ch. 12, "Flight to the Ford")

As Aragorn and the four hobbit companions made their way towards Rivendell through the Trollshaws, they came upon the three trolls that Bilbo and the dwarves had encountered many years earlier, and had seen turned to stone at daybreak. Sam Gamgee recited a comic poem, "The Stone Troll", on the supposed dangers of kicking a troll, who has a "seat" which is "harder than stone", to cheer everyone up.

Olog-hai they were called in the Black Speech. That Sauron bred them none doubted, though from what stock was not known... Trolls they were, but filled with the evil will of their master: a fell race, strong, agile, fierce and cunning, but harder than stone. Unlike the older race of the Twilight they could endure the Sun, so long as the will of Sauron held sway over them. They spoke little, and the only tongue that they knew was the Black Speech of Barad-dûr.

— Tolkien's description of the trolls in Appendix F "Of Other Races" in The Return of the King (Note: Tolkien 1955 Appendix F "Of Other Races")

Cave trolls attacked the Fellowship in Moria. One had dark greenish scales, black blood, and a hide so thick that when Boromir struck it in the arm his sword was notched. However, Frodo was able to impale the "toeless" foot of the same troll with the enchanted dagger Sting. (Note: Tolkien 1954a, book 2, ch. 5 "The Bridge of Khazad-dûm")

Mountain trolls wielded the great battering ram Grond to shatter the gates of Minas Tirith. (Note: Tolkien 1955, book 5, ch. 4 "The Siege of Gondor") They fought using clubs and round shields at the Battle of the Morannon. (Note: Tolkien 1955, book 5, ch. 10, "The Black Gate Opens") Sauron bred mountain and cave trolls, and developed the more intelligent Olog-hai that were not vulnerable to sunlight.

Snow trolls are mentioned only in the story of Helm Hammerhand. When Helm went out during the Long Winter clad in white to ambush his enemies, he was described as looking like a snow-troll. (Note: Tolkien 1955, Appendix A. II "The House of Eorl")

The Trollshaws is a wooded region, lying north of the East Road between the rivers Hoarwell and Bruinen, where Bilbo encountered the trolls. It is not named in the text of either The Hobbit or The Lord of the Rings, but appears on the latter's map of Middle-earth drawn by Christopher Tolkien. Described as "the Trolls' wood" in the main text, the name "Trollshaws" is derived from troll + shaw, an archaic term for a thicket or small wood.

=== The Silmarillion ===
Last of all Húrin stood alone. Then he cast aside his shield, and wielded an axe two-handed; and it is sung that the axe smoked in the black blood of the troll-guard of Gothmog until it withered...

— from "Nirnaeth Arnoediad" in The Silmarillion (Note: Tolkien 1977, ch. 20 "Of the Fifth Battle: Nirnaeth Arnoediad", p. 195)

Morgoth, the evil Vala, created trolls in the First Age of Middle-earth. (Note: Tolkien 1955 Appendix F, "The Languages and Peoples of the Third Age", "Of Other Races") They were strong and vicious but stupid; as in The Hobbit, they turned to stone in sunlight. During the wars of Beleriand, Gothmog (the Lord of Balrogs) had a bodyguard of trolls. During the Nírnaeth Arnoediad, the Battle of Unnumbered Tears, in which Morgoth defeated the united armies of Elves, Men, and Dwarves, the great warrior Húrin, a Man, faced Gothmog's trolls to protect the retreat of the Elven king Turgon. Morgoth's order to Gothmog to capture Húrin alive allowed Húrin to kill all the trolls. Many trolls died in the War of Wrath, but some survived and joined Sauron, the greatest surviving servant of Morgoth. (Note: Tolkien 2007, ch. 2 "The Battle of Unnumbered Tears")

== Origins ==
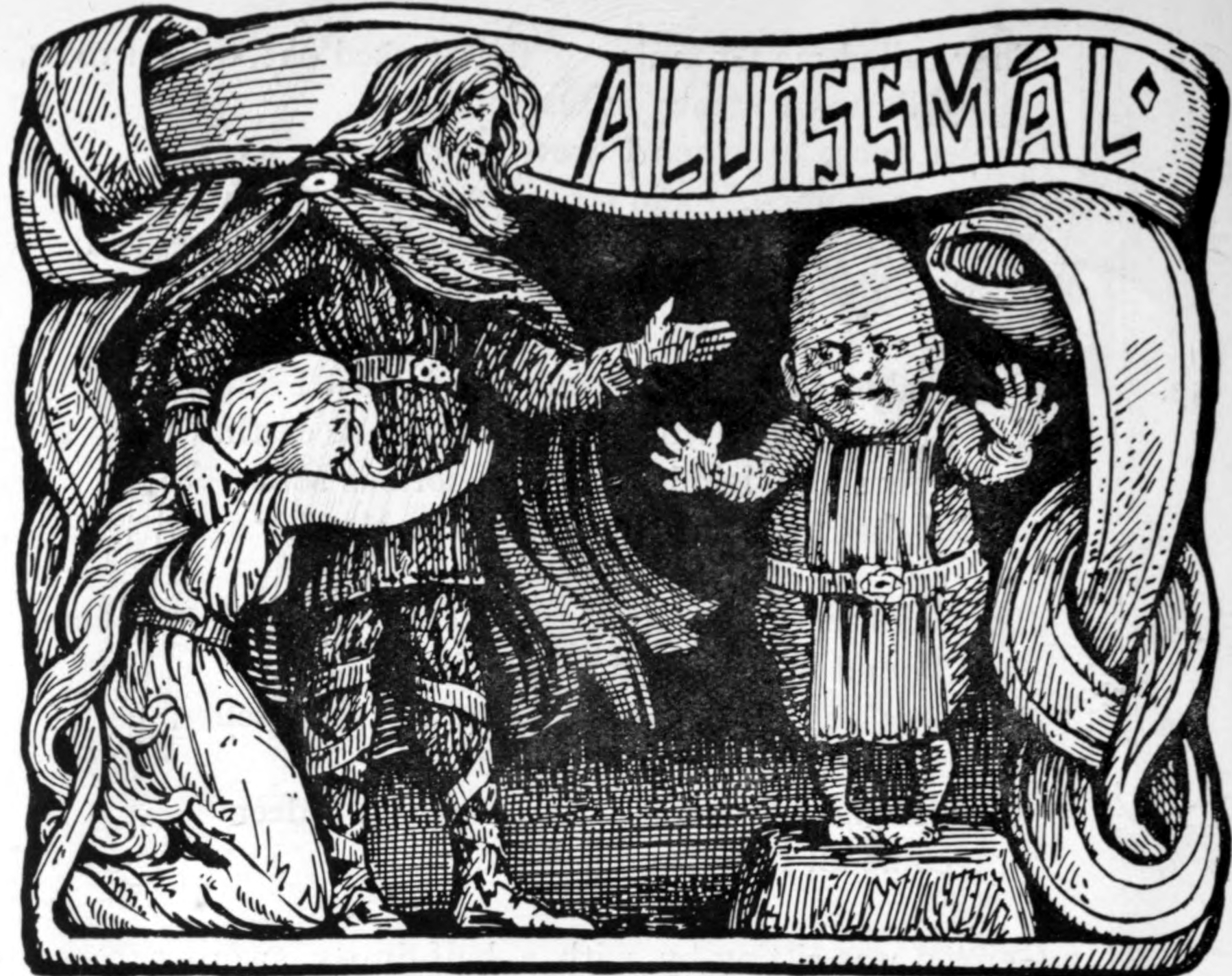
In Norse mythology, the god Thor talked to the dwarf Alviss to prevent him from marrying his daughter Þrúðr; at dawn Alviss turns to stone. Drawing by W. G. Collingwood, 1908

In Germanic mythology, trolls are a kind of giant, along with rísar, jötnar, and þursar; the names are variously applied to large monstrous beings, sometimes as synonyms. The idea that such monsters must be below ground before dawn dates back to the Elder Edda of Norse mythology, where in the Alvíssmál, the god Thor keeps the dwarf Alviss (not a troll) talking until dawn, and sees him turn to stone.

Tom Shippey, a Tolkien scholar, writes that The Hobbit's audience in 1937 were familiar with trolls from fairy tale collections such as those of Grimm, and Asbjørnsen and Moe's Norwegian Folktales; Tolkien's use of monsters of different kinds – orcs, trolls, and a balrog in Moria – made that journey "a descent into hell". Attebery writes that Trolls thus moved from being grim Norse ogres to more sympathetic modern humanoids. In her view, Tolkien's trolls are based on the ogre type, but with two "incarnations": ancient trolls, "creatures of dull and lumpish nature" in Tolkien's words, (Note: Tolkien 1955, Appendix F, I, "Of Other Races", "Trolls") unable to speak; and the malicious giants of strength and courage bred by Sauron with "enough intelligence to present a real danger". The scholar of English Edward Risden agrees that Tolkien's later trolls appear far more dangerous than those of The Hobbit, losing, too, "the [moral] capacity to relent"; he comments that in Norse mythology, trolls are "normally female and strongly associated with magic", while in the Norse sagas the trolls were physically strong and superhuman in battle.

Christina Fawcett, a scholar of English, writes that Tolkien synthesises materials from different eras, so his writing and his creatures can take on different qualities, from playful to monstrous; his hill-trolls "while still threatening, are primarily comic and slow-witted". On the other hand, when Gandalf outwits them, these same trolls are seen as "monstrous, a warning against vice, captured forever in stone for their greed and anger." All the same, Fawcett cautions that Tolkien uses tradition selectively, transferring the more positive attributes of Norse trolls, including being rich and generous, to hobbits.

== Analysis ==
=== Trolls in The Hobbit ===
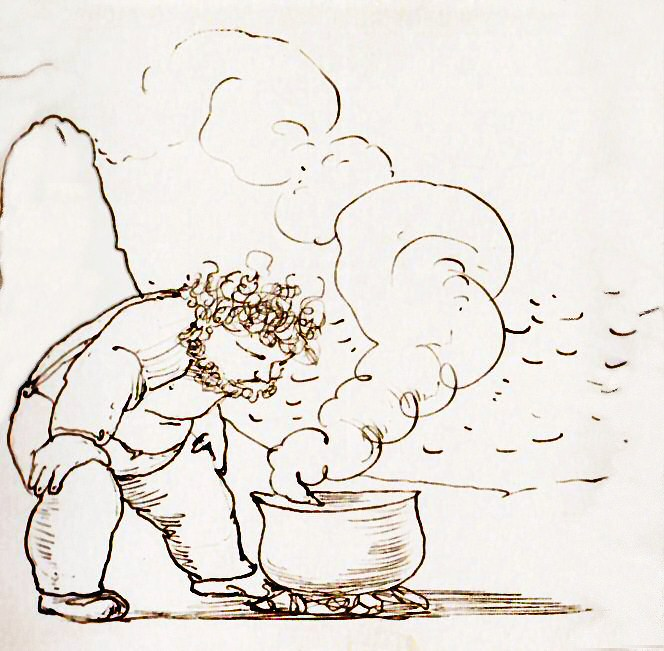
Tolkien based details such as the trolls' tiredness with mutton on William Morris's travels in Iceland. Drawing of Morris cooking in Iceland c. 1870 by Edward Burne-Jones

Shippey criticises Tolkien's class-based depiction of the trolls and goblins in The Hobbit, writing that the trolls were too close to labourers, just as the goblins were to munitions workers. Shippey notes, too, Tolkien's storytelling technique here, observing that making the troll's purse (which Bilbo attempts to steal) able to speak blurs the line between the ordinary and the magical.

Marjorie Burns, a scholar of English literature, writes that the trolls' tiredness with eating mutton every day matches the fantasy writer and designer William Morris's account of his travels in Iceland in the early 1870s, one of many Middle-earth features that follows Morris, including the existence of trolls: Morris mentioned visiting places called Tröllakirkja ("Trollchurch") and Tröllahals ("Trollneck"). Burns notes, too, that the adventure with the three trolls combines Bilbo's fear of being eaten with the temptation of the "fine toothsome smell" of roast mutton.

The critic Gregory Hartley notes that while in The Hobbit, Tolkien's trolls were still much like those of Norse mythology, "archetypal, stereotypical ... basking in unexamined sentience", in The Silmarillion and Lord of the Rings, "Tolkien undertook the difficult task of melding fairy tale with epic, which was in turn bonded with the Christian mythos. Characters and creatures began functioning on a multiplicity of registers." The entertainingly "light-hearted informality" of The Hobbit's Cockney-speaking trolls thus gave way to the "more bestial trolls" of the later works. Hartley comments that the redaction effort that Tolkien threw himself into for his legendarium was driven by the way he had composed The Hobbit; and that the resulting "rich, curious roles" that trolls and other beasts play in Middle-earth would not have existed without it.

=== Speech, sentience, and souls ===
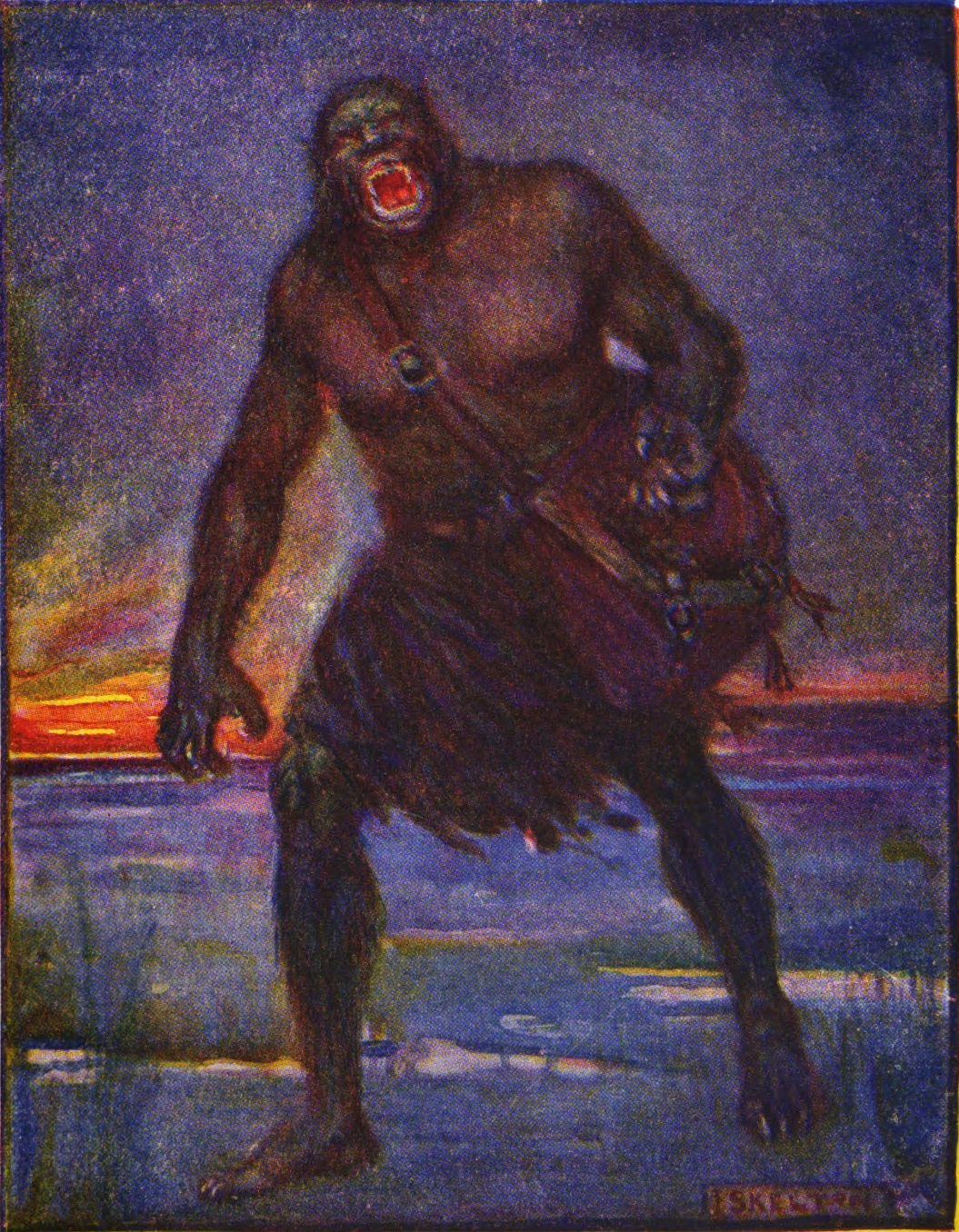
Tolkien's wordless trolls have been compared to Grendel, a monster in Beowulf. Illustration by J. R. Skelton, 1908

Fawcett suggests that Tolkien's "roaring Troll" in The Return of the King reflects the Beowulf monster Grendel's "[fiery] eye and terrible screaming." Noting that Tolkien compares them to beasts as they "came striding up, roaring like beasts ... bellowing", she observes that they "remain wordless warriors, like Grendel", although they are sentient, with intelligence and a single language, unlike the varied tongues of Tolkien's orcs.

Critics including Fawcett and Hartley note that by making all the beasts in The Hobbit talk, Tolkien, a devout Roman Catholic, had created a serious problem for himself: if trolls and other monsters were supposed to be sentient, they would in Christian terms have souls and be redeemable rather than wholly evil. Tolkien acknowledged this keenly-felt question: "Of course ... when you make Trolls speak [Tolkien's emphasis] you are giving them a power, which in our world (probably) connotes the possession of a 'soul'." (Note: Carpenter 2023, #153, to Peter Hastings, September 1954.) Fawcett distinguishes the approach of Tolkien's narrator, who treats trolls as "wholly monstrous", from his "translator's notes" which take "a slightly more balanced view". She states that Tolkien adopts a similar multiplicity of viewpoints on the in-fiction creation of trolls: Frodo tells Sam that the Shadow cannot create "real new things of its own", but all the same, she writes, the "stone-bred mockery" seems very much alive. This is, Fawcett writes, in contrast to Tolkien's intelligent dragons, which are straightforwardly a created species with the power of speech, but certainly monsters; and in contrast to orcs which, if they are corrupted elves, do have souls. She concludes that Tolkien's linking of souls to speech "complicates these monstrous races".

Tolkien had another conceptual problem with the existence of evil creatures, as he believed that while good could create, evil could not. So he considered whether his evil creatures could have been corrupted from sentient beings, and whether they could breed, writing various and contradictory explanations of their origins. In The Two Towers, the leader of the Ents, Treebeard, remarks that trolls were "made ... in mockery of Ents", as Orcs were of Elves. (Note: Tolkien 1954, book 3, ch. 4, "Treebeard") Friedhelm Schneidewind, writing in the J. R. R. Tolkien Encyclopedia, states the precise origin of trolls "perhaps from giant apes but possibly from Men, Orcs, or 'Spirits'" is not given by Tolkien, but like Orcs, trolls were bred by Melkor and Sauron for their own evil purposes.

=== Defeat of evil ===
The Inklings scholar Charles A. Huttar writes that the trolls' presence, alongside orcs and the Balrog, means that "Moria not only houses inert obstacles but active monsters". Burns notes that with the destruction of Sauron, trolls, like the rest of Sauron's minions, were scattered in defeat, though some survived by hiding in the hills. In Burns's view, this makes Tolkien appear both optimistic, since evil can be defeated, and pessimistic, as that defeat is never absolute.

=== Country folk music ===
The Tolkien scholar David Bratman writes that even though there is no sheet music in Tolkien's Middle-earth writings, we do "surprisingly" have "a very good idea" of how some of it should sound. In 1952, Tolkien recited part of The Lord of the Rings for George Sayer to record, and sang Sam Gamgee's song of the Stone Troll, unaccompanied and in a "rough and untrained" voice; but as Bratman comments, "but surely so was Sam's." Sayer states in the liner notes of the LP album of the recordings that Tolkien sang the song to "an old English folk-tune called The Fox and Hens." Bratman states that this is a variant of "The Fox and the Goose" or "The Fox Went Out on a Chilly Night". (Note: The melody can be heard on YouTube.) He comments that Tolkien sings in a major key, like Cecil Sharp's "southern English melodies" for the song. Bratman finds this "appropriate", noting Tolkien's comment that the Shire "is in fact more or less a Warwickshire village" of around 1897. In short, Bratman concludes, Tolkien intended readers to imagine Hobbits as "English country folk singing English folk songs." The poem appears also in The Adventures of Tom Bombadil; in the Tolkien critic Paul H. Kocher's words, it achieves a certain "grisly slapstick".

== Adaptations ==
=== Film ===
A cave-troll in Peter Jackson's The Fellowship of the Ring

Trolls are replaced by "Groans" in Gene Deitch's 1967 animated short film adaptation of The Hobbit.

In Rankin/Bass's animated 1977 adaptation of The Hobbit, the trolls were voiced by Paul Frees, Jack DeLeon, and Don Messick, who all also voiced other characters.

Ralph Bakshi's 1978 animated version of The Lord of the Rings follows the book faithfully in its depiction of the encounter with the cave troll in the Chamber, though the cave troll's foot has toes. Glenn Gaslin, reviewing the film on Slate, describes a clip from the film as "of ravenous trolls, [which] does no justice to Tolkien's darker elements".

Trolls appear in Peter Jackson's The Lord of the Rings film trilogy. In The Fellowship of the Ring, Bilbo Baggins recounts his altercation with the three stone-trolls and later on, the four hobbits and Aragorn are shown resting in the shelter of the petrified trolls. The location used was Piopio, Waitomo District, in New Zealand. In the mines of Moria, a single cave troll, animated in software, is among the attackers and is depicted with two toes.

An armoured troll approaches Aragorn during the Battle of the Morannon in The Return of the King

In The Return of the King, trolls fight in the Battle of the Pelennor Fields, and Aragorn fights an armoured troll in the Battle of the Morannon, a departure from the book; Jackson had at one stage intended Aragorn to fight the Dark Lord Sauron in person, but "wisely" reduced this to combat with a troll.

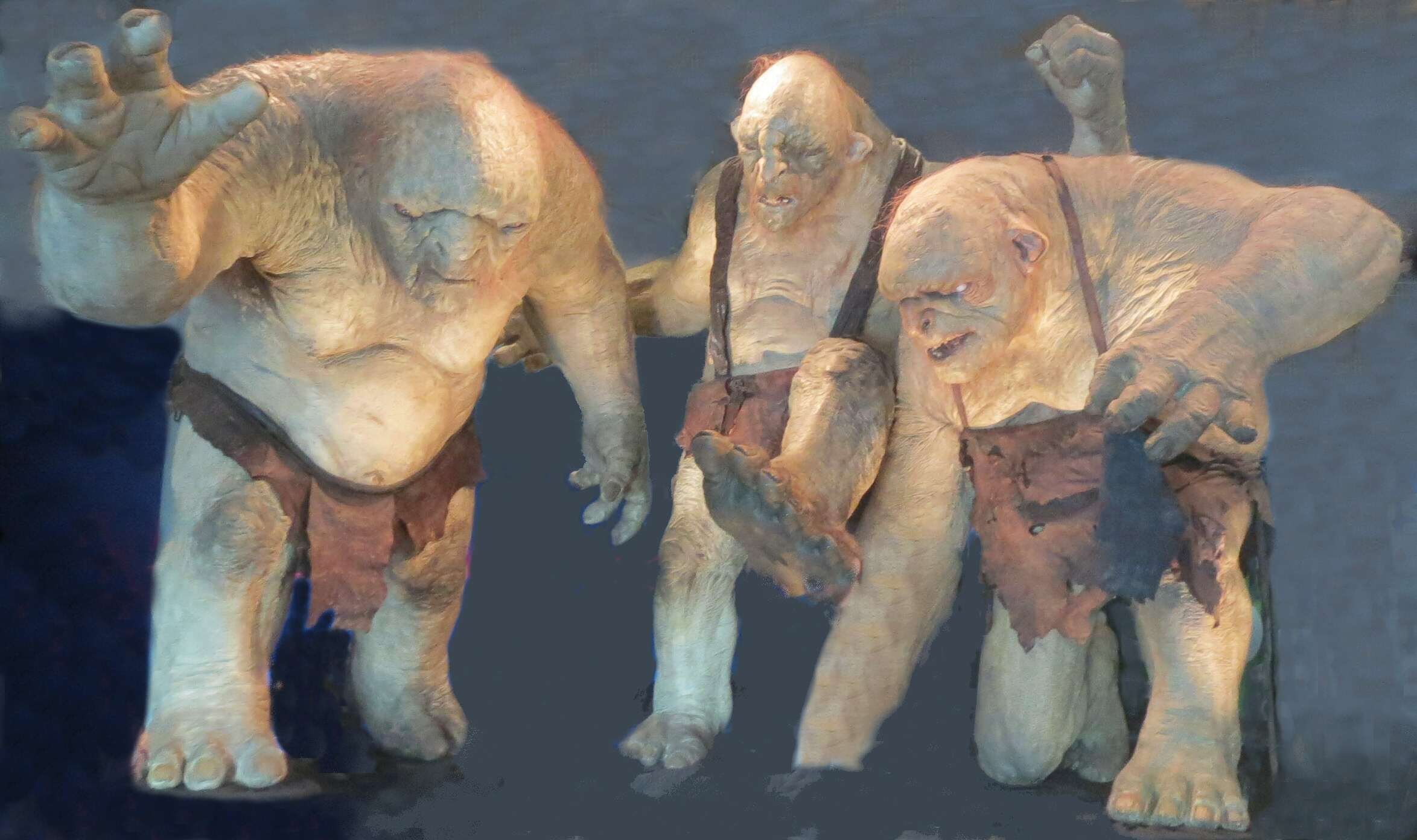
Stone trolls as they appear in The Hobbit: An Unexpected Journey, at Te Papa.

In The Hobbit: An Unexpected Journey the three stone trolls appear as in Tolkien's book. The trolls are portrayed through voice and motion capture with Bert performed by Mark Hadlow, Tom is performed by William Kircher, and William is performed by Peter Hambleton.

In The Hobbit: The Battle of the Five Armies, trolls appear in Azog's army as shock troops. Some of the trolls have catapults mounted on their backs while others have bladed shields and other strange weaponry, such as one troll who had flails sutured to its limbs. Behind the scenes, Peter Jackson's design team added trolls to the orc army, saying that they were a "natural extension of the orcs' forces".

=== Television ===
The trolls appear in the Amazon Studios series The Lord of the Rings: The Rings of Power. The first episode of season one featured a snow-troll that attacked Galadriel's group at the abandoned fortress at Forodwaith. She was able to slay the snow-troll. Season two features a hill-troll named Damrod (voiced by Benjamin Walker in "The Eagle and the Sceptre", Jason Smith in "Doomed to Die") who allies with Adar's forces. Damrod is described by Adar to be the "Eater of Dragon Bones" and "Slayer of the Stone Giants". After bringing back the head of an orc messenger sent to persuade him to ally with Adar, Damrod asks "Where is Sauron"?

=== Games ===
Trolls have featured in many video games set in Middle-earth, including The Lord of the Rings: The Battle for Middle-earth, The Lord of the Rings: The Battle for Middle-earth II, The Lord of the Rings: The Third Age, and The Lord of the Rings: Conquest. In The Lord of the Rings: The Battle for Middle-earth II: The Rise of the Witch-king, the Angmar faction has a hill-troll hero named Rogash (voiced by Gregg Berger), and an Olog-hai named Brûz the Chopper (voiced by Gideon Emery) is important to the plot of Middle-earth: Shadow of War.

Middle-earth trolls have appeared in tabletop role-playing games; for example, the core book for Middle-earth Role Playing, published by Iron Crown Enterprises, included rules for Normal Trolls, Olog-hai (or Black Trolls), and Half-Trolls, and the publisher released an adventure module called Trolls of the Misty Mountains. Middle Earth Strategy Battle Game includes trolls, while Games Workshop produce a selection of troll miniatures.
