= Eastmond =

Eastmond is a surname. Notable people with the surname include:

- Aalayah Eastmond (born 2001), American activist
- Barry Eastmond, American musician, composer, songwriter, and record producer
- Craig Eastmond (born 1990), English footballer
- Gertrude Eastmond (died 2024), Barbadian businesswoman and politician
- Kyle Eastmond (born 1989), English rugby union player
