= Country Yumkins =

Line of plush dolls

Country Yumkins were a line of plush dolls available by mail from Del Monte at various times between 1982 and 1990. Conceptualized by McCann-Erickson, San Francisco, the Country Yumkins were the biggest and most extensive consumer promotion in Del Monte's 68-year history (Dougherty).

Country Yumkins

The promotion began in September, 1982, and focused on four characters, all stuffed toys with Del Monte designations: Sweetie Pea, Reddie Tomato, Lushie Peach, and Cobbie Corn. Initially, customers could get a free Yumkin with only 50 labels of any of Del Monte's extensive line of canned fruits and vegetables, frozen foods, beverages (including Hawaiian Punch), or a range of convenience and specialty foods (Robinson 1, p. 100). Despite Del Monte's concerns that consumers would really collect 50 labels for a single toy, the company received 20,000,000 labels and distributed 450,000 Yumkin dolls (Robinson 1, p. 100). The following September, the original four Country Yumkins returned with four new friends: Snappy Bean, Juicy Pineapple, Cocky Crow, and Shoo-Shoo Scarecrow. During the 1983 promotion, the initial offering of getting a Yumkin for five Del Monte labels and $8.95 was discontinued, and the price rose from 50 labels to 75 labels per Yumkin, and the response stayed just as strong (Robinson 2, p. 86). An additional 25,000,000 labels were mailed to Del Monte, and in turn 550,000 new Yumkins were sent to consumers (Robinson 1). Supermarket Shopper's Martin Sloane reported that collecting Yumkins "had become a craze. Cans of Del Monte fruits and vegetables were moving off the grocery shelves as fast as they could be re-stocked" (Robinson 1, p. 101).

In 1984 Del Monte introduced just one new character to what by then had become the "Country Fair" storewide promotion: Fluffy Lamb. In addition to the in-store advertising, single page ads in Family Circle, Hadassah, Ebony, and Essence magazines, and network commercials, Del Monte also advertised the Country Yumkins with a special publicity campaign. Sand sculpture contests were held at two popular beaches in New York City and Los Angeles, where a Country Yumkin was a requirement of the sculpture, and TV star June Lockhart, a professional sand sculptor, and a "walk around" Sweetie Pea character served as judges. Additionally, Sweetie Pea appeared in parades, including a Ringling Bros. elephant walk (Robinson 1, 103). By the end of the third year of the promotion, 1.5 million Country Yumkins were ordered by more than 1 million consumers, about 700,000 of which had paid entirely by Del Monte product labels (Robinson 2). The promotion was put on hiatus in March 1986, only to be revived in 1988 with Country Strawberry as a new character, and again in 1990 with Precious Pear and Brawny Bear. In 1990, a Yumkin would cost 80 Del Monte labels and a $2.00 handling charge (Robinson 2).

In 1991 Del Monte released a set of Country Yumkin Christmas Ornaments.

The initial 9 Yumkin dolls (Sweetie Pea, Lushie Peach, Reddie Tomato, Cobbie Corn, Snappy Bean, Juicy Pineapple, Cocky Crow, Shoo-Shoo Scarecrow, and Fluffy Lamb) were made by a company called Trudy based in Norwalk, CT. The Country Strawberry and Precious Pear dolls were made by Sundara Industries, LTD of San Francisco, CA. The Brawny Bear doll was made by R. Dakin & Company of San Francisco, CA.
