= Trude Sojka =

German painter

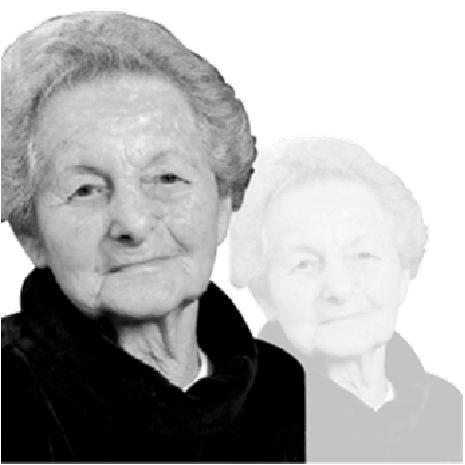
- Trude Sojka (1999)
- Born: Gertrud Herta Sojka Baum; 9 December 1909; Berlin, German Empire
- Died: 18 March 2007 (aged 97); Quito, Ecuador
- Education: Prussian Academy of Arts
- Known for: Painting, Sculpture
- Movement: Expressionism

Gertrud Sojka, known as Trude Sojka (9 December 1909 – 18 March 2007), was a Czech – Ecuadorian and Jewish painter and sculptor, creator of an original technique using recycled materials and concrete. She was born in Berlin, Germany and died in Quito, Ecuador.

== Biography ==
=== Early life ===
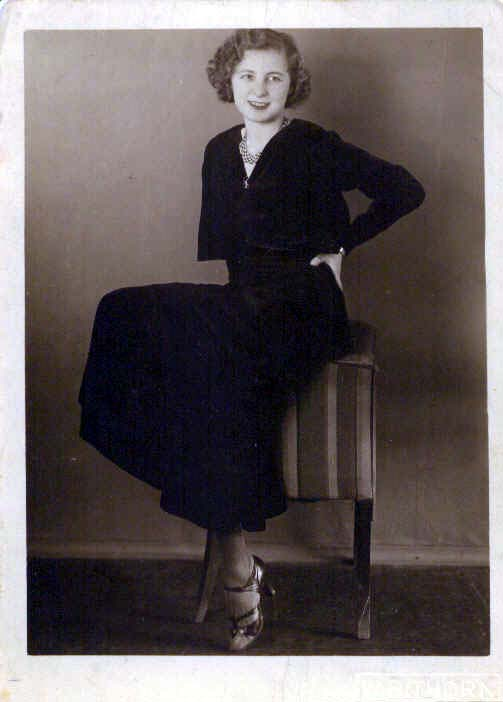
Trude Sojka in 1929 (?)

Gertrud Herta Sojková Baum was born on 9 December 1909 in Berlin to Czech Jewish parents. Her father, Rudolf Sojka, was an engineer, who had business dealings with the Ecuadorian president Eloy Alfaro pertaining to the Ecuadorian Railway system. Rudolf Sojka and his wife, Hedwig Baum, had three children: Waltre, (born in 1907), Gertrud and Edith, who was the youngest. Soon, the family moved to Prague, Czechoslovakia to Na Poříčí Street.

Upon graduation from high school, her father enrolled Sojka, against her wishes, at the Faculty of Economics. Trude was so bored that she spent her time drawing caricatures of her teacher. Without her fathers' knowledge she enrolled in the Prussian Academy of Arts in Berlin. Her talent as a painter lead her to exhibit at the Märkisches Museum in Berlin. Aged 27, in 1936, she graduated as top student. Her father died a couple of years later of a heart attack.

=== Holocaust survival ===
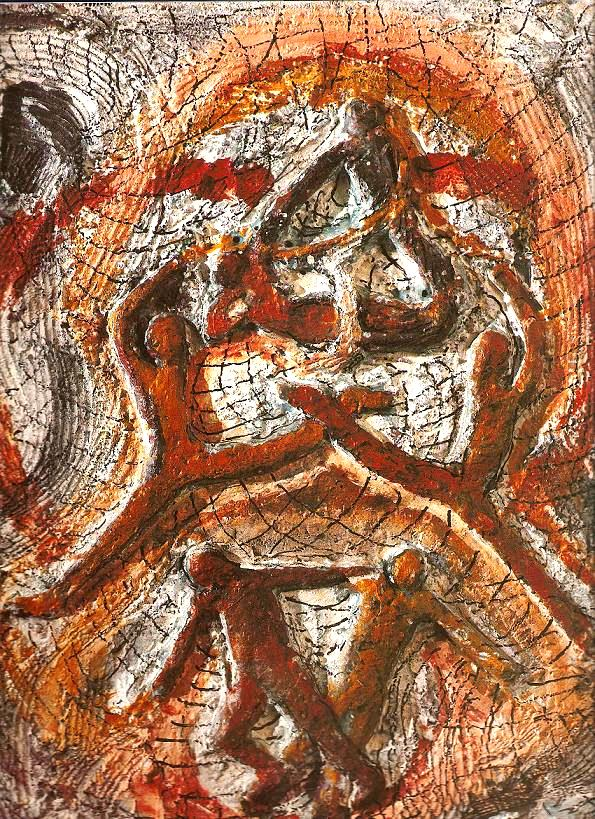
Auschwitz suicides with wires, 1974, acrylics and cement over cardboard, CCTS

With Hitler's rise to power and the invasion of Czechoslovakia by the Third Reich, Sojka's non-practicing Jewish family was threatened. In 1938, Sojka married Dezider Schwartz, a Slovak civil servant. They moved to live in Nitra, Slovakia, at Priehradná 6 street. In 1942, the couple was apparently transported to Majdanek concentration camp. This information remains unclear. Perhaps they managed to escape or hid, because in 1944 they were living in the same place, in Nitra. After the National Uprising, they werd sent first to Sered' labour camp, then, in October 1944, to Auschwitz Concentration Camp.

In November, Trude is transferred to Gross-Rosen concentration camp, sub camp: Kudowa-Sąkisch. And in March 1945, as her pregnancy was beginning perhaps to be noticeable, she was put in Zittwerke-Kleinschönau concentration camp, where other Jewish pregnant women were held as well. She gave birth on 4 May 1945. Seven days later the camp was liberated by the Russians. On 29 May, her daughter, Gabriele Evelin Schwartz died.

She could never find Dezider Schwartz again. Edith, Trude's sister, along with her husband and child had died in Terezin, and her mother, Hedwig, had been shot in a forest near Maly Trostinec. But she found in the Red-Cross a paper from her older brother, Waltre, looking for his family. He was living in Ecuador since 1938. Waltre had been invited to Ecuador to give chemistry lectures in the Central University of Ecuador and, with his wife Lidy Hutzler, decided it was safer to stay there, at least until the war finished. Trude decided to join them.

Before that, she spent a year traveling in search of her family and paintings, working various jobs to save enough for the journey to the New Continent.

Sojka's experience in Auschwitz left her traumatized: she witnessed people die in front of her every day (including her daughter), walk barefoot in the snow, and even dig their own graves. The only food she got to eat was a "soup" (with unknown things floating in it), a little hard stale bread, potatoes and fruit and vegetable peels. She survived for nearly a year in the camp mainly due to her ability for massage.

=== Arrival to Ecuador ===
"When I arrived to the port of Guayaquil, my brother was waiting for me with his arms wide open. Only that when I got out from the ship, I went running straight to hug a bunch of bananas", Sojka used to joke. In fact, arriving to Ecuador she is delighted by the number of exotic fruits and things one could find nowhere in Europe at that time. Sojka was fascinated by the culture, the indigenous people and the landscape. Little by little she learns Spanish pronounced with curious accents. Also, she finds some resemblances between the Quichua language and the Czech language. She discovers is the autochthonous and aboriginal art, that she starts studying as soon as possible: a source of inspiration to her own works.

Sojka begins working for her brother and his wife, both in his factory and at his handicraft store, called AKIOS, (Sojka written in reverse), in the Historic Center of Quito, in a neighborhood called Loma Grande.

==== Life in Ecuador ====
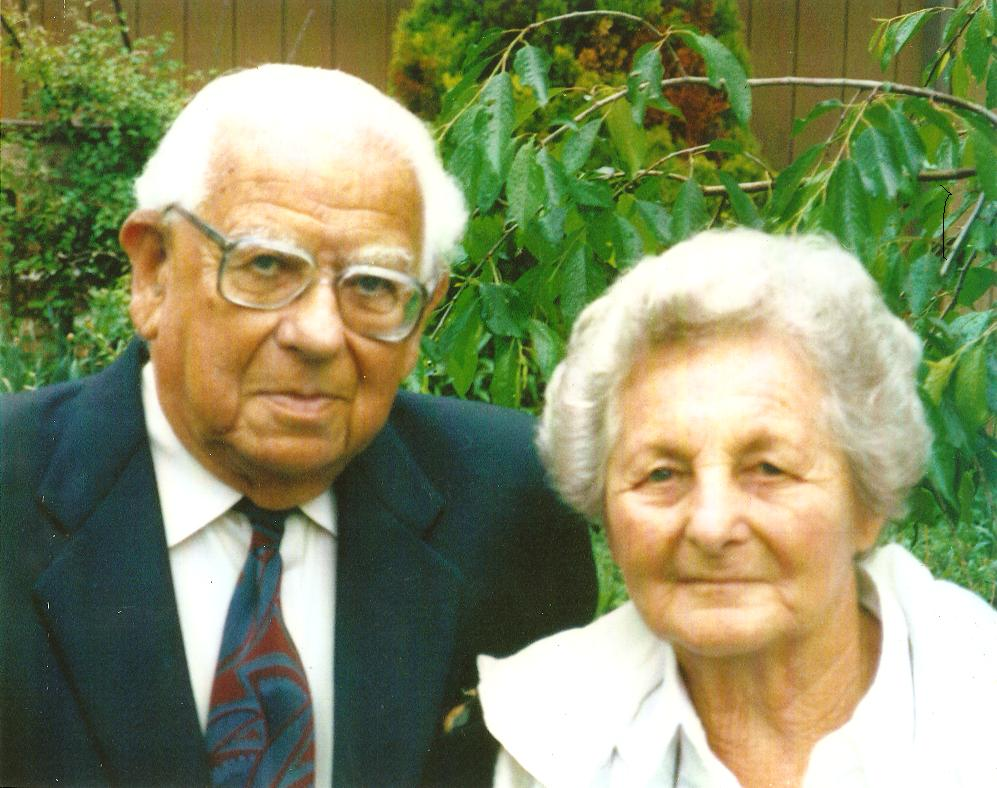
Trude Sojka and his husband Hans Steinitz, 1994

When Sojka arrived in Guayaquil, she met a good friend of her brother, who was also a Holocaust survivor, who managed to run away from Sachsenhausen concentration camp with the excuse he had been hired as a lawyer by a cotton company in Ecuador. He was helped out by honorary consul of Ecuador in Bremen José Ignacio Burbano Rosales, recognized for opening the door of his country to so many Jews.

In 1948 Hans Steinitz and Sojka were married. Their first child, Eva Graciela Hedvika Steinitz, was born in 1949. They had two other girls: Ruth Miriam Edith and Anita Steinitz, now the director of the Trude Sojka Cultural House in Quito.

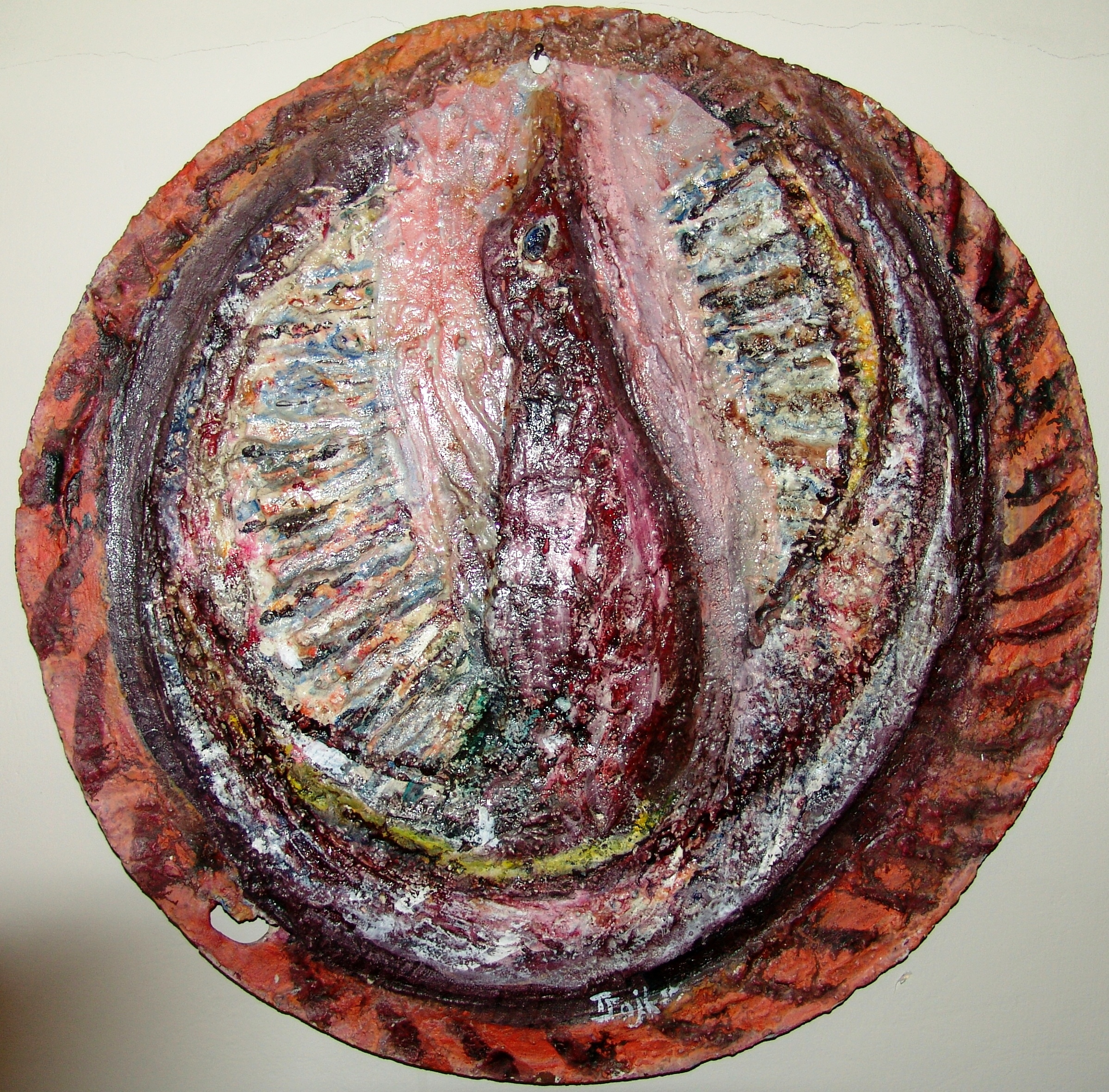
"Nest (Phoenix)", 1981, Acrylics and cement over brass, CCTS

The artist then dedicates almost completely to her art. By these times, she gets to meet great Ecuadorian artists, such as Gilberto Almeida, Víctor Mideros, Manuel Rendón o, during the '90s, or Pilar Bustos. She even gets to teach sculpture to Oswaldo Guayasamín.

Thereafter, Sojka lived calmly with her husband Hans Steinitz. She had two granddaughters: Geetha Kannan (born in 1985), daughter of Miriam, and Gabriela F. Steinitz (born in 1995 to Anita). Hans Steinitz died on 23 May 1996, from an oesophageal cancer.

=== Last years ===
On Sojka's 90th birthday, the Casa de la Cultura Ecuatoriana "Benjamín Carrión" (Ecuadorian House of Culture) paid her homage, naming her "Emeritus artist" during a reception, in which a retrospective exhibition of her artworks was held. At the same event, the book "The two lives of Trude Sojka", written by Rodrigo Villacís Molina was launched. This is just one of the many tributes that are made for Sojka, including exhibitions in the Guaranda and Riobamba.

On 2001, Sojka suffered a stroke. She managed to overcome it with a minimum of memory loss. She continued, though, to make heavy paintings and sculptures with cement and recycled materials up to the age of ninety-five. When her hands got too fragile, she ceased working with cement. However, she never stopped painting and drawing.

At the beginnings of 2007, Sojka suffered a Respiratory failure. On 18 February that year, exactly a year after the death of her daughter "Chela" (Eva Steinitz), which was not told to her, Sojka entered hospital, where she had a second stroke. She died, at home, on 18 March, from a respiratory failure. Her remains rest in the Jewish cemetery in the city of Quito, along with those of her husband.

== Artwork ==
=== Influences ===
Trude Sojka's work evolved in response to the various experiences in her life. Sojka studied at the Academy of Fine Arts in Berlin, where she became familiar with Expressionism. She became familiar with the works of Marc Chagall, Chaïm Soutine and Georges Rouault. She deeply admired the sculptures of Ernst Barlach and is likely to have personally known the work of the expressionist-realist Käthe Kollwitz.

Once she was established in Quito, she worked for the handicrafts factory Akios. Walter and Liddy Sojka had employed a number of locals who were reproducing all kinds of useful and traditional objects to sell and even export to other countries in America and Europe. So Trude Sojka got directly in touch with these indigenous people working for the factory.

=== Subjects ===
In Europe, Sojka became already interested in the primitive art of Africa, Oceania and America (which can also be considered somehow expressionist). This she had surely learned visiting ethnographic museums. Thus, when after World War II, in 1946, she came to Ecuador, she was amazed to discover so closely the Pre-Columbian art. Her first paintings in Ecuador, created in 1950, depict her experiences in Auschwitz. She also worked a lot around the meaning of her last name: Sojka, a bird that wanders around the woods of eastern Europe.

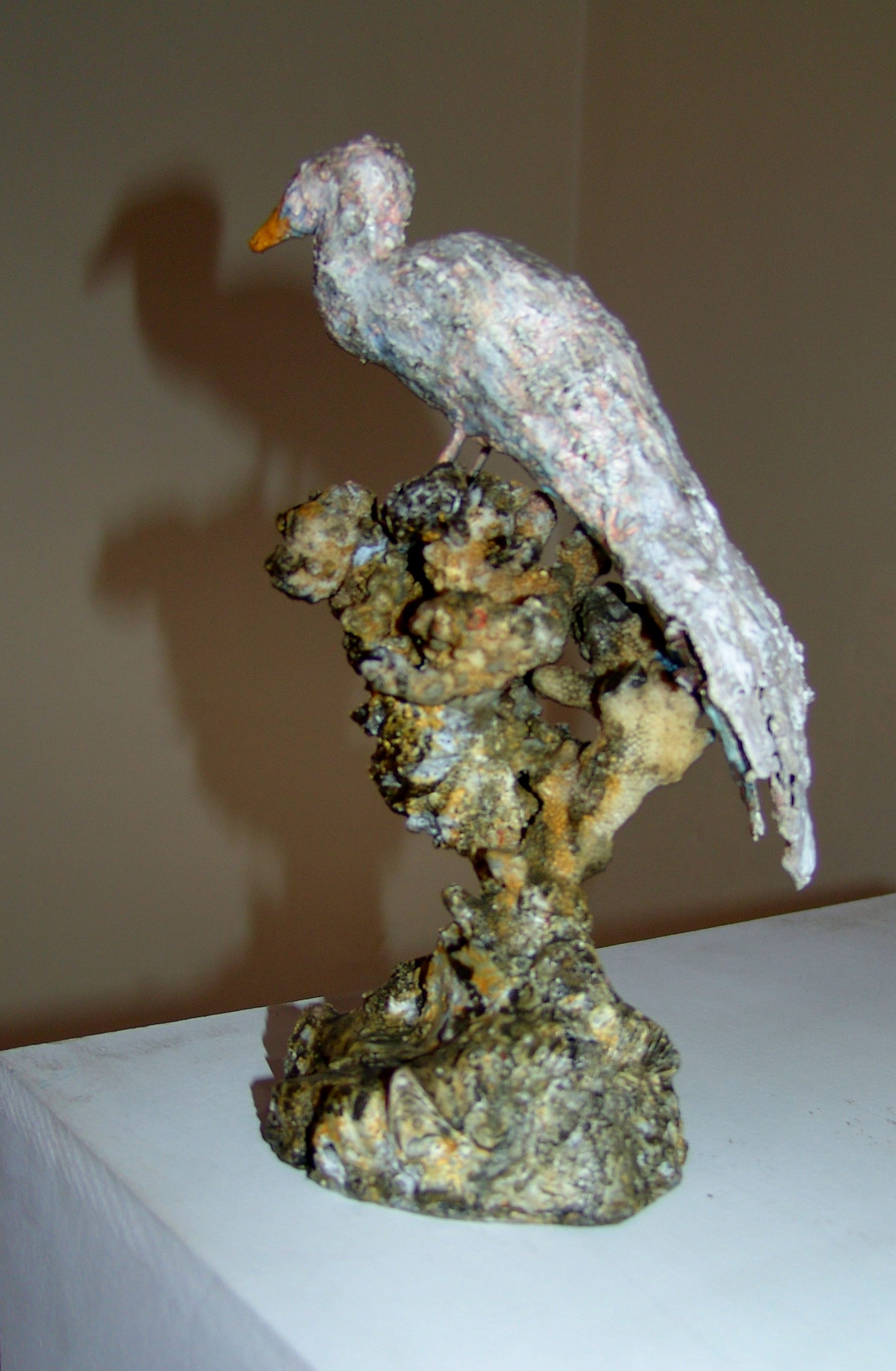
"Bird", 1973, cement, acrylics, corals, wires and other recycled materials, CCTS

Later on, she studied again, but this time deeply, Precolombian art, especially traditional Ecuadorian Indigenous art and its different divinities. Therefore, she introduced many of its figures to her European Expressionist way of painting, which is unique. Meanwhile, her paintings developed to be more gay: nature, the universe, prayers, nostalgic memories of her beloved Czechoslovakia... became her main subjects. At the end of the 20th century, when her two granddaughters were born, she painted many more tender figures, such as her well-known painting: El cuento de las mariposas amarillas (The yellow butterfile's fairytale).

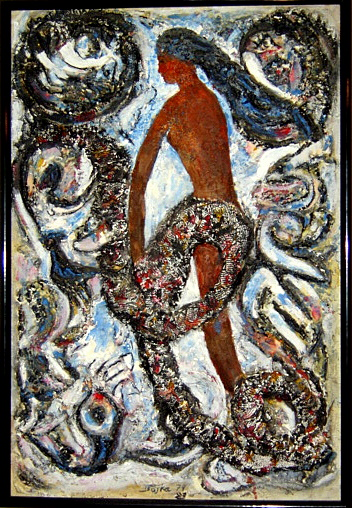
"Eva and the snake", 1951, cement and acrylics over wood, CCTS

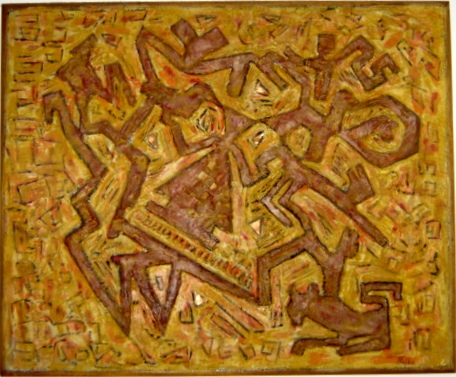
"Precolombian", 1961, cement and acrylics over wood, CCTS

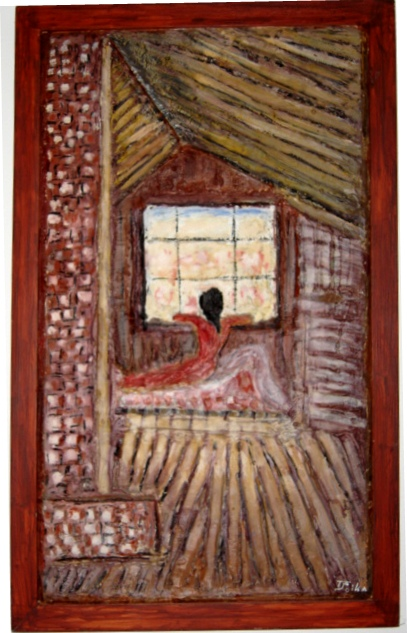
"Woman next to window", 1979, cement and acrylics over wood, CCTS

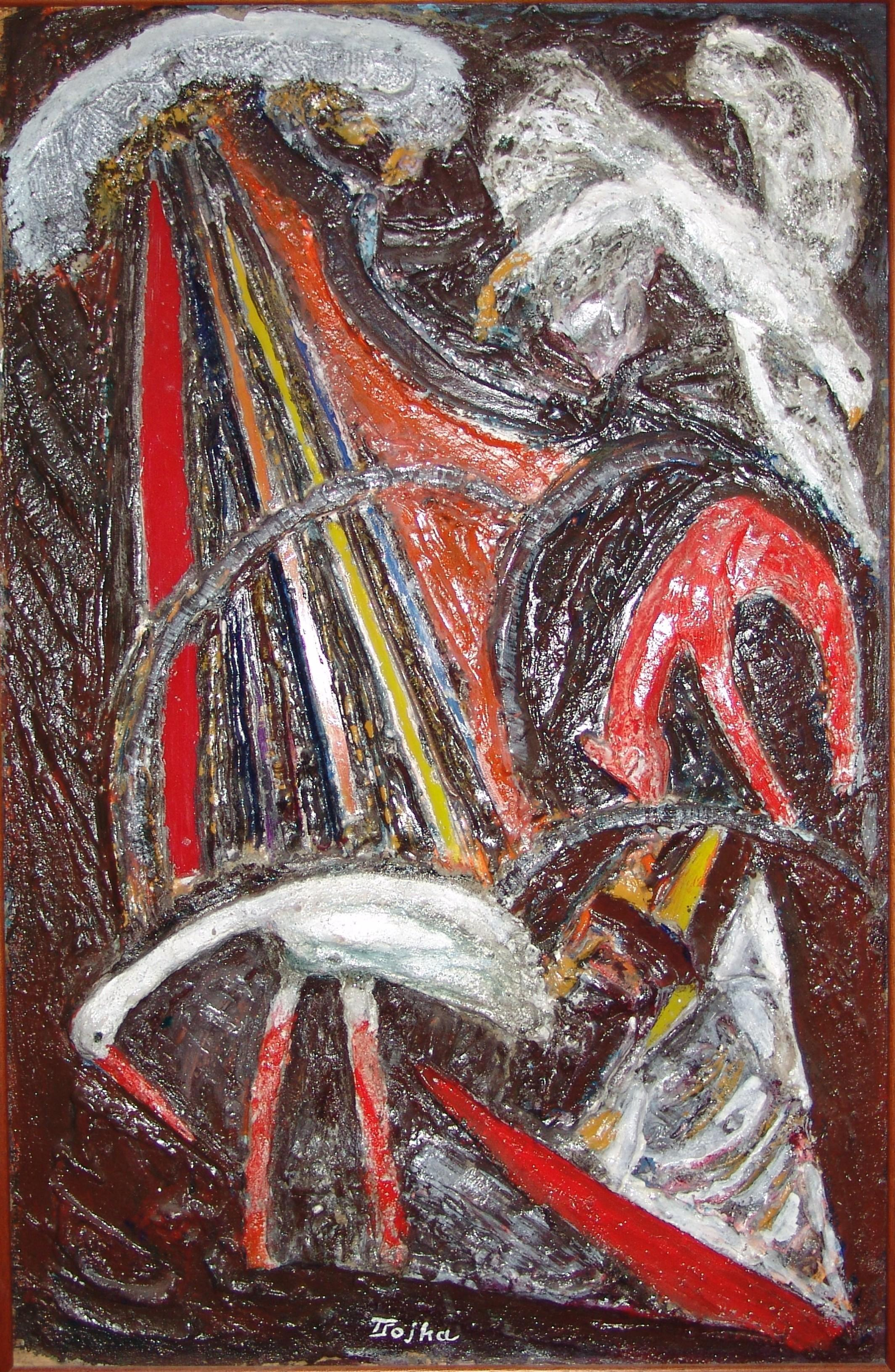
"Heron", 1978, cement and acrylics over wood, CCTS

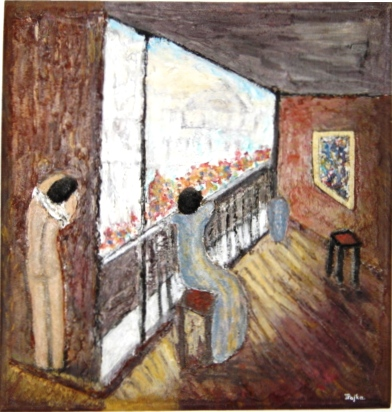
"The window", 1979, cement and acrylics over wood, CCTS

=== Special Technique ===
Trude Sojka's works are considered to be very special as well because of its technique. The artist used cement, a very hard material that dries fast, to make her paintings, the same way as she would make her sculptures, giving second dimension to the usually flat surface. She came up with the idea because she loved to work with clay, but cement was cheaper and more challenging. To fix the cement to the wooden or cardboard surface, she used a glue that her brother Walter Sojka, a chemist, invented just for her. Moreover, she was a pioneer in Ecuador, and probably in Latin America as well, to use recycled materials within her artworks, such as broken glass, pieces of metal, wheel structures, tiles, dustbin covers... Because she believed on the value of each little object, in the aftermath of the tremendous experience in the concentration camps, back in Europe. She covered the gray surfaces with acrylics instead of oils, much widely in use at the beginning of the fifties. Her artworks are thus very heavy and fragile because they can easily break.

== The Trude Sojka House Museum ==
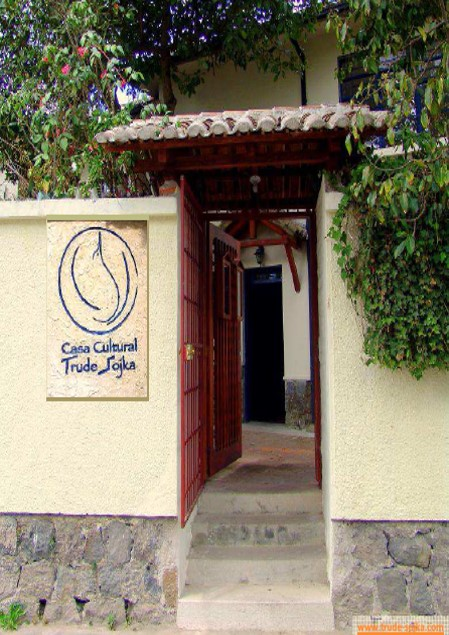
Entry to the Trude Sojka Cultural House, Quito, Ecuador.

On 12 March 2009, one week before the second anniversary of Sojka's death, her daughter Anita Steintz opened to the public the house of the artist turned into the Trude Sojka Cultural House. The house remained almost untouched. Only some rooms were adapted in order to improve the exhibition conditions. Visitors can also appreciate the sculpture garden, with the original plants of the house. Besides, the huge collection of Trude's husband, Hans Steinitz, was turned into a library. Many temporary exhibits, concerts, projections and lectures and many other cultural activities were held, using the adaptable spaces of the house. It is in this place that the Czech inhabitants of Ecuador reunited from time to time.

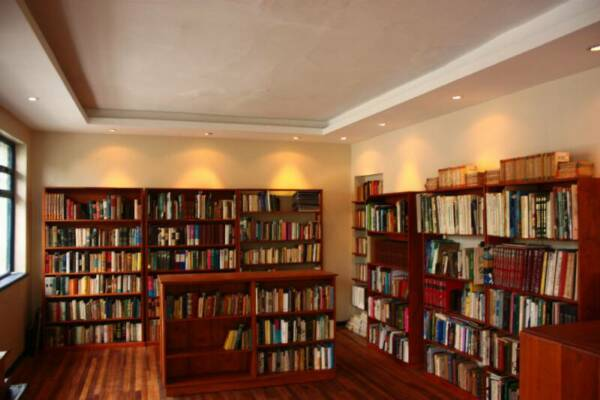
Hans Steinitz' library

Since 2020, the institution has become the Trude Sojka House Museum. Her more than 300 works of art are shown in a series of turning exhibitions.

The Yad Vashem has named the Trude Sojka House Museum a Holocaust memorial and a Freedom Station by the Ohio community.
