= Gertrudis =

Gertrudis is a feminine given name. People with that name include:

- Gertrudis Anglesola (1641–1727), Valencian abbess and mystic
- Gertrudis Bocanegra (1765–1817), who fought in the Mexican War of Independence
- Gertrudis de la Fuente (1921–2017), Spanish biochemist
- Gertrudis Echenique (1849–1928), First Lady of Chile between 1896 and 1901
- Gertrudis Gómez de Avellaneda (1814–1873), 19th century Cuban born writer who lived in Spain
- Maria Gertrudis "Tules" Barceló (1800–1852), saloon owner and gambler in New Mexico
- Santa Gertrudis (disambiguation)
