= Gertrud Bürgers-Laurenz =

German painter (1874–1936)

Gertrud Bürgers-Laurenz (September 1, 1874 – August 21, 1959) was a German flower and portrait painter.

== Life ==
Laurenz was born in Hanover. He studied under Franz Skarbina at the Academy of Fine Arts in Berlin and under Hugo von Habermann in Munich. She met her future husband, the painter Felix Bürgers, in the studio of Ludwig Schmid-Reutte in Karlsruhe. She lived in Dachau from 1901 onwards. Her portraits capture movements and moods in characteristic color tones, attaching importance to similarity and are usually cleverly composed in space. Works by her are exhibited in the Museum August Kestner. Characteristic of her work are numerous portraits, which were strongly influenced stylistically by her teachers. After their marriage in 1904, the couple co-founded the "Dachau Artists' Group". Their house, at Herzog-Albrecht-Straße 1 (now 12), became a meeting place for artists in the town. For many years, it housed a residential home for people with disabilities. The villa has been privately owned since 2014.

After the death of her husband, she moved away from Dachau in 1934 and lived in her hometown of Hanover in the district of Waldheim.

== Selected works ==
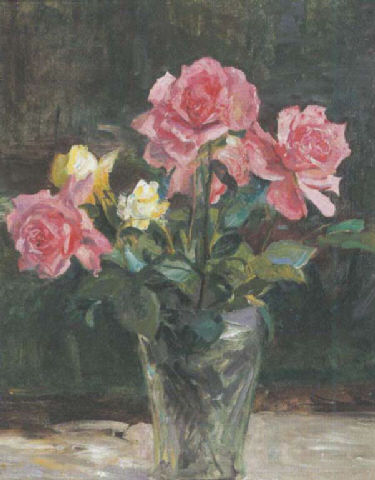
Rosenstrauß in gläserner Vase Oil, Lwd. 54 × 42 cm (1930)

- Eine Dachauer Bäuerin in Festtracht oil on cardboard 65 × 49 cm
- Zwei spielende Kinder mit Vogelkäfig Oil on canvas 69 × 89 cm
- Stilleben mit Rosen
- Portrait
- Rosen in gläserner Vase
- 1905: Portrait of Mayor Törner
- 1907: Portrait of the philosopher Gottfried Wilhelm Freiherr von Leibnitz
- Emilie Stockmann

== Literature ==
- Bürgers-Laurenz, Gertrud. In: Ulrich Thieme, Felix Becker, Fred. C. Willis, Hans Vollmer (Hrsg.): Allgemeines Lexikon der Bildenden Künstler von der Antike bis zur Gegenwart. Begründet von Ulrich Thieme und Felix Becker. 37 Bände. (1907–1950, Band 1 bis 15 online einsehbar). Wilhelm Engelmann, E. A. Seemann, Leipzig.
- Carl Thiemann: Erinnerungen eines Dachauer Malers. Dachau n.d., p. 21.
- Ottilie Thiemann-Stoedtner: Der Dachauer Maler Felix Bürgers. In: Amperland Haft 7, 1971, pp. 149–152.
