= Trude =

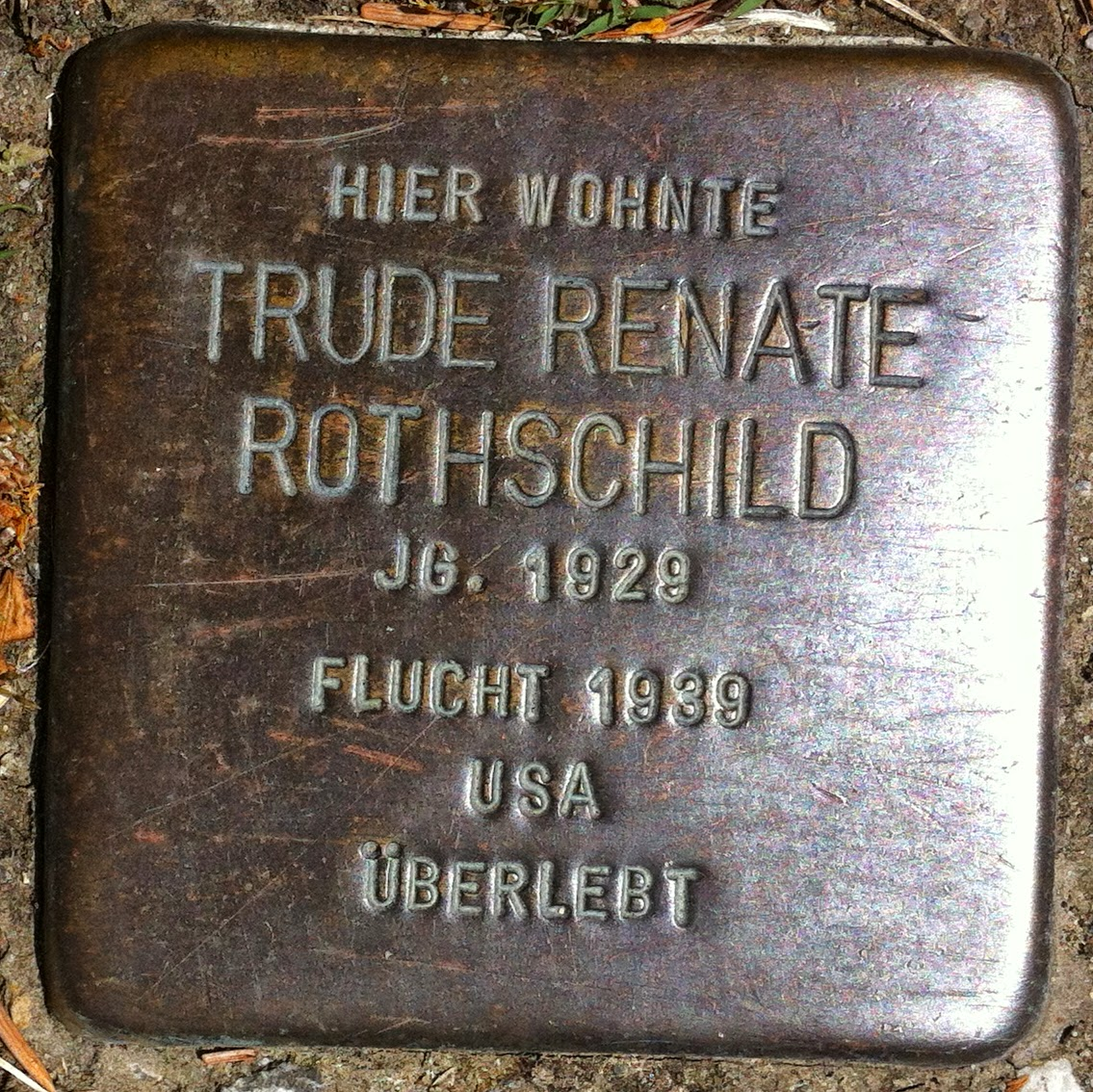
- Stolperstein dedicated to Trude Renate Rothschild
- Gender: Female
- Name day: Norway and Sweden: 17 March

Origin
- Origin: Old Norse
- Region of origin: Denmark, Norway, Germany and German-speaking countries

Other names
- Related names: Trud, Trudi, Thrude, Gertrude, Gertrud, Þrúður

Trude is a Germanic Old Norse feminine given name meaning "strength". The name is now most commonly found in Germany and German-speaking countries and in Norway. It is sometimes used as a diminutive of the given names Gertrude and Gertrud.

== Notable people named Trude ==
- Trude Beiser (born 1927), Austrian alpine ski racer
- Trude Berliner (1903–1977), German actress
- Trude Dothan (1922–2016), Israeli archaeologist
- Trude Drevland (born 1947), Norwegian nurse and politician
- Trude Dybendahl (born 1966), Norwegian cross-country skier
- Trude Eick (born 1969), Norwegian musician and composer
- Trude Eipperle (1908–1997), German operatic soprano
- Trude Feldman (1924–2022), American reporter, columnist and correspondent
- Trude Fleischmann (1895–1990), Austrian-American photographer
- Trude Gimle (born 1974), Norwegian alpine skier
- Trude Guermonprez (1910–1976), German-American textile artist and designer
- Trude Gundersen (born 1977), Norwegian taekwondo practitioner
- Trude Haefelin (1914–2008), German actress
- Trude Harstad (born 1974), Norwegian biathlete
- Trude Herr (1927–1991), German actress, singer and theatre owner
- Trude Hestengen (born 1983), Norwegian dressage rider
- Trude Hesterberg (1892–1967), German actress
- Trude Klecker (born 1926), Austrian alpine skier
- Gertrude Kleinová (aka Trude Kleinová; 1918–1976), Czech table tennis player
- Gertrude Kolar (aka Trude Kolar; 1926–2014), Austrian artistic gymnast
- Trude Brænne Larssen (born 1967), Norwegian novelist
- Trude Lash, (1908–2004), German political activist and associate of Eleanor Roosevelt
- Trude Lehmann (1892–1987), German actress
- Gertrude Liebhart (aka Trude Liebhart; 1928–?), Austrian sprint canoer
- Trude Malcorps (1921–2026), Dutch swimmer
- Trude Marlen (1912–2005), Austrian actress
- Trude Marstein (born 1973), Norwegian author
- Trude Mohr (1902–1989) German Nazi Party League of German Girls leader
- Trude Möhwaldová (1915–?), Czech alpine skier
- Trude von Molo (1906–1989), Austrian actress
- Trude Mostue (born 1968), Norwegian veterinary surgeon and television personality
- Trude Raad (born 1990), Norwegian track and field athlete
- Trude Richter (1899–1989), German writer, literary scholar and political activist
- Trude Rittmann (1908–2005), German-American composer
- Trude Sojka (1909–2007), Czech–Ecuadorian painter and sculptor
- Trude Stendal (born 1963), Norwegian footballer
- Trude Trefall (aka Manjari; born 1978), Norwegian singer
- Trude Unruh (1925–2021), German politician
- Trude Weiss-Rosmarin (1908–1989), German-American writer, editor, scholar and feminist activist
- Trude Wollschläger (1912–1975), German swimmer

== Fictional characters ==
- Trude, a character in the Australian television situation comedy Kath & Kim
