= Trudie =

Trudie is a female given name. Notable people with the name include:

- Trudie Chalder, English professor
- Trudie Goodwin (born 1951), English actress
- Trudie Lamb-Richmond (1931–2021), American educator
- Trudie Lang, English professor
- Trudie Kibbe Reed, American academic administrator
- Trudie Styler (born 1954), English actress

== See also ==
- Trudy
