= Gertruda =

Gertruda is a feminine given name related to Gertrude. It may refer to:

- Gertrude of Babenberg, Duchess of Bohemia (c. 1118–1150), Gertruda Babenberská in Czech
- Gertrud Bense (1933–2021), Gertruda Benzė in Lithuanian, German linguist specializing in the Lithuanian language
- Gertruda Biernat (1923–2016), Polish geologist and paleontologist
- Gertruda Komorowska (1754–1771), Polish noblewoman who died under mysterious circumstances after her forced divorce
- Gertruda Sekaninová-Čakrtová (1908–1986), Czech and Czechoslovak lawyer, politician, diplomat of Jewish origin and dissident
- Gertruda Uścińska (born 1958), Polish lawyer and political scientist
