= Waldheim (Hanover) =

Coordinates: 52°21′N 9°47′E

Waldheim (German pronunciation: [ˈvalthaɪm]) is a quarter (Stadtteil) of the city Hanover in Germany about 5 km SSE from the city center, located at an elevation of 60 m above sea level. Part of the Stadtbezirk Döhren-Wülfel, it has 1,732 inhabitants (2020).
