= Gertrudis Anglesola =

Venerable Gertrudis Anglesola
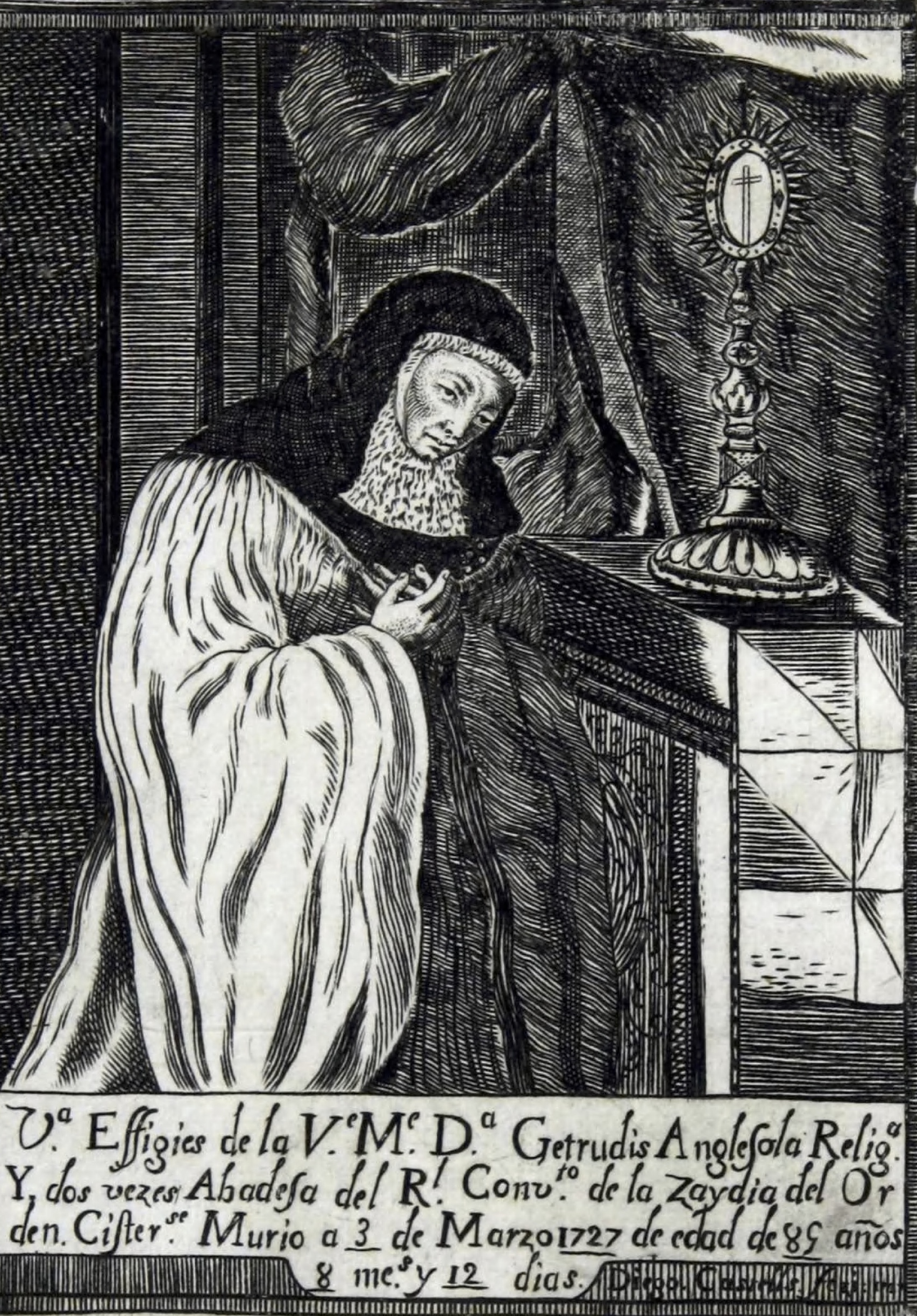
- Portrait of Gertrudis Anglesola, from the collection of prints Illustrious Valencians (1830)

Personal life
- Born: 19 June 1641 Valencia
- Died: 3 March 1727 (aged 85) La Zaydía, Valencia
- Parent: Miguel Jerónimo de Anglesola (father)

Religious life
- Religion: Christianity
- Order: Cistercians

Senior posting
- Teacher: Guiomar de Anglesola (aunt)

Gertrudis Anglesola (19 June 1641 in Valencia – 3 March 1727 in La Zaidía, Valencia), also known as Gertrudis de Anglesola, was an abbess and mystic of the Gratia Dei monastery and the Cistercian Monasterio de la Zaidía, outside the Valencian city walls. Of her writings, she left letters and an autobiography of her day-to-day activities as well as her thoughts. She also wrote spiritual poetry.

== Early life and education ==
Gertrudis, like many other nuns of her century, was from a noble family. Her father, Miguel Jerónimo de Anglesola, came from a distinguished family that had its land and origin in the duchy of Montblanch (Catalonia). When she was orphaned at a very young age, her grandfather, Guillem Ramón de Anglesola, commissioned an aunt, Guiomar de Anglesola, who was in the Monastery of La Zaidía, to take care of Gertrudis and educate her, so it was decided to admit Gertrudis to the same convent.

== Career ==
Gertrudis seems to have asked to be dressed as a nun at the age of eleven. She succeeded, and a few months later, she became ill and had to be sent back to her grandfather to recover. Almost a year later, she rejoined again and began a life of dedication and piety. Despite the opposition of some nuns, who feared her mystical visions, she professed in 1667, and after holding various offices, she became abbess of the monastery in 1709.

She was procurator from 1705 to 1709; porter from 1693 to 1697; sacristan from 1701 to 1709, and abbess from 1709 to 1713 and from 1722 to 1726. This could not have been possible for a person without great qualities and acceptance by the community and recognized gifts. During her government, she gave great evidence of prudence and skill in the administration of business and the selection of nuns who would hold important positions.

Following the advice of her confessor, the Trinitarian José de San Juan de Mata, Gertrudis began a spiritual autobiography where she narrated both her daily life and her thoughts. On another occasion, Father Vicente Tosca, from the Oratory, ordered Gertrudis to accept medical care and undergo surgery. From the age of 26 onwards, she became ill and very lonely. She led the monastic life with great suffering and, apparently, also with great consolations.

== Death and legacy ==
When she died at La Zaydía, Valencia, in 1727, her remains were buried in a wooden chest in the choir of the monastery church.

Her Sermón funebre en las exequias de la Va Sra Doña Gertrudis Anglesola was published posthumously, a year after her death.

The autobiographical document she wrote served as the basis for a later biography, written by José Vicente Ortí y Mayor, entitled Vida, virtudes y prodigios de la venerable señora doña Gertrudis de Anglesola (Life, Virtues and Prodigies of the Venerable Lady Doña Gertrudis de Anglesola) and published in 1743.

Jaime Torrent y Cros devotes a chapter to her in his Glorias Valencianas (1886).

== Selected works ==
- Sermón funebre en las exequias de la Va Sra Doña Gertrudis Anglesola (1728)
- Cartas espirituales
- Profesión de fe, esperanza y caridad que articulaba diariamente
- Protestación sobre las oracions que pronunciaba a lo largo del día
- Poesías espirituales

== Sources ==
- Poutrin, Isabelle (1995). La voile et la plume: Autobiographie et sainteté féminine dans l'Espagne moderne [The Veil and the Pen: Autobiography and Female Sanctity in Modern Spain] (in French). Madrid: Casa de Velázquez. ISBN 9788490961025.
- Ortí y Mayor, José Vicente (1743). Vida, virtudes, y prodigios de la venerable Señora Doña Gertrudis Anglesola, religiosa Cisterciense, y dos vezes Abadesa en el Monasterio de N. Sra. de Gratia Dei, vulgo, de la Zaydia, en la Ciudad de Valencia [Life, virtues, and wonders of the venerable Lady Gertrudis Anglesola, Cistercian nun, and twice Abbess in the Monastery of Our Lady of Gratia Dei, commonly known as Zaydia, in the City of Valencia] (in Spanish). Madrid: Joseph Thomás Lucas.
- Yáñez Neira, María Damián (1956). "La Venerable Gertrudis de Anglesola: 1641 - 1727" [The Venerable Gertrudis de Anglesola: 1641 - 1727]. Cistercium. VIII: 249–54. ISSN 0210-3990.
