= Gertrude Aubauer =

Austrian journalist and politician (born 1951)

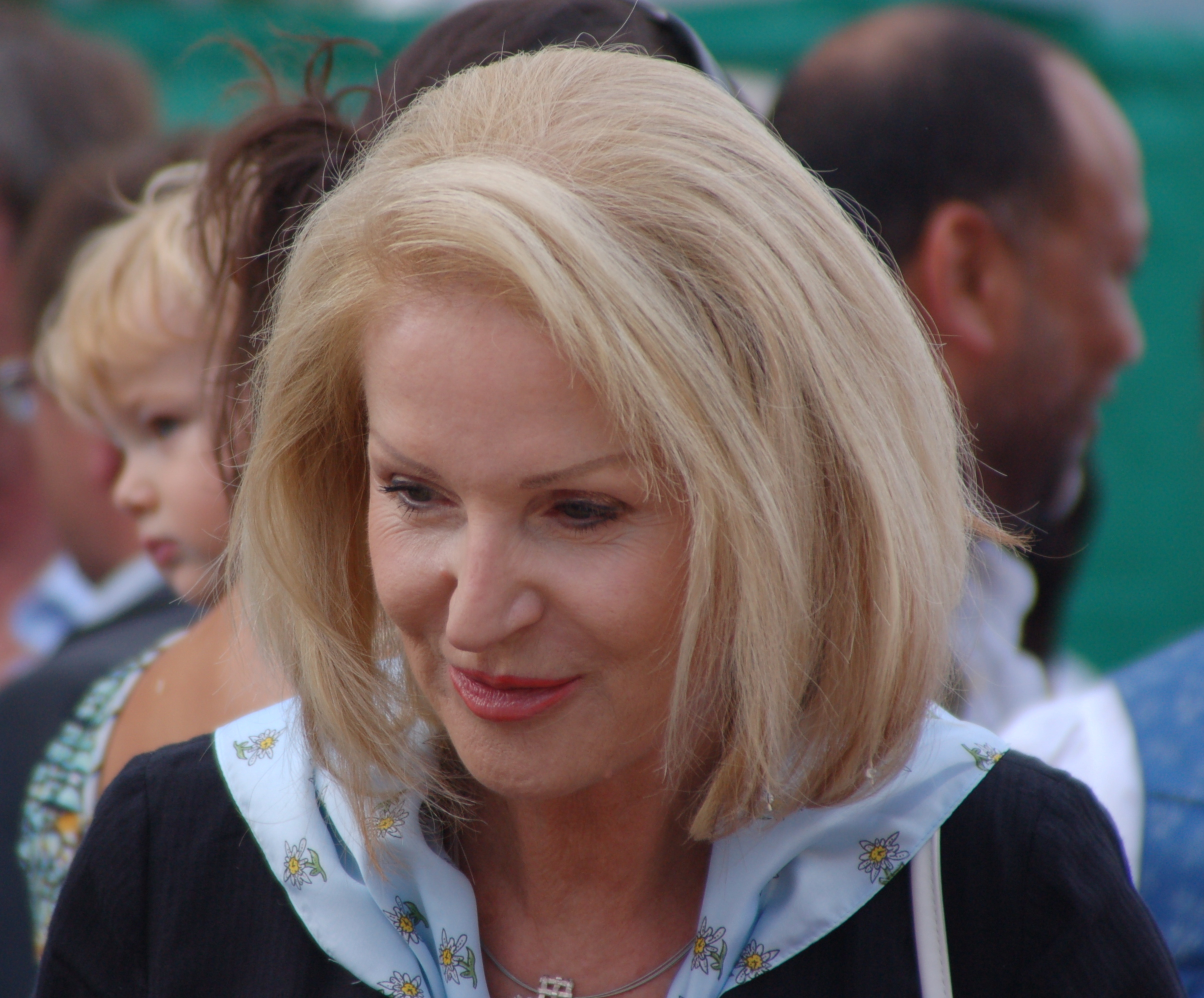
- Born: 13 July 1951 (age 75); Vienna, Austria
- Education: University of Vienna
- Occupation: Journalist
- Political party: Austrian People's Party
- Other political affiliations: Social Democratic Party of Austria
- Awards: Leopold Kunschak Press Prize; Decoration of Honour for Services to the Republic of Austria

Gertrude Aubauer (born 13 July 1951) is an Austrian journalist and politician. While serving at the Austrian Parliament for the Austrian People's Party she mostly involved in activities targeting senior citizens.

== Early life and education ==
Aubauer was born in Vienna on 13 July 1951. She received a degree in economics from the University of Vienna in 1974.

== Career ==
Following her graduation Aubauer began to work as a journalist at the Österreichischer Rundfunk, national public broadcaster of Austria in 1975. She was first employed at the ORF radio, Studio Vienna. Then she served as the parliamentary editor and the moderator of the parliamentary program Hohes Haus. From 1980 she was employed at Zeit im Bild which she moderated between 1986 and 1994. In 1981 she joined the Social Democratic Party of Austria and left the party in 2000. She worked at the press office of the Parliament from 1995 and also, contributed to the paper Kronen Zeitung.

Aubauer became a member of the Austrian People's Party in 2006. She was elected as a member of the Parliament in 2006 and served there for three terms during the XXIV., XXV. and XXIII. legislations. Her activities were generally towards the senior people. Her term at the Parliament ended in late 2017. Then she joined the Senior Citizens' Association, serving as its deputy chair.

=== Awards ===
Aubauer was awarded the Leopold Kunschak Press Prize in March 2004. She is the recipient of the Decoration of Honour for Services to the Republic of Austria in gold which was awarded to her on 12 July 2017.
