= Mist (valkyrie) =

Valkyrie in Norse mythology

In Norse mythology, Mist (Old Norse "cloud" or mist) is a valkyrie. Mist appears in valkyrie list in the Poetic Edda poem Grímnismál and both of the Nafnaþulur valkyrie lists. No further information is provided about her. Rudolf Simek says that her name, Mist, is likely related to Old Norse mistr, meaning "cloud, mist," and that this "reminds us of the way in which valkyries can ride through the air and over water," such as in the Poetic Edda poems Helgakviða Hjörvarðssonar and Helgakviða Hundingsbana II.
