= Gertrude Massey =

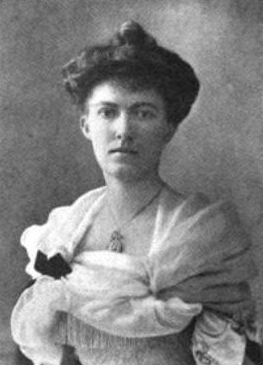
- 1903
- Born: Gertrude Seth; 21 February 1868; Brixton, London, England
- Died: 7 December 1957 (aged 89); Bognor Regis, England
- Spouse: Henry Gibbs Massey (m. 1890)
- Children: 1
- Family: Florence Seth (sister)

Gertrude Massey (née Seth; 21 February 1868 – 7 December 1957) was an English society painter and watercolourist who specialised in portrait miniatures.

== Biography ==
Gertrude Seth was born in Brixton and grew up in Penge, the daughter of Prussian-born merchant Gustav Seth. Her sister Florence Seth (1870–1953) was also an artist.

After the death of her father, she enrolled at the Croydon School of Art and began painting for money, including selling calendars and postcards in local shops. She then studied at Herkomer Art School in Bushey, where she met her husband and fellow painter Henry Gibbs Massey. The couple married on 16 October 1890 and lived in St John's Wood. They had a daughter Eva (born 1894).

It was around this time Massey began painting miniature portraits, particularly of children and pets, onto ivory and building an "upwardly mobile" clientele, which expanded to include Royalty. She painted over 30 miniatures for the Royal family over the course of her career, with 11 under her belt by 1904 and 22 commissions by 1912. She was especially favoured by Alexandra of Denmark, who invited her to her drawing room at Balmoral. Massey also painted landscapes, urban scenes and studies of Edwardian life. These were Post-Impressionist-influenced.

Massey first exhibited at the Royal Academy in 1897. She returned to the Royal Academy in 1904. From 1898 to 1918, Massey also exhibited at institutions including the Fine Art Society, the New Gallery, the Royal Miniature Society, the Walker Art Gallery and the Paris Salon.

In 1907, her husband bought and became principal of the Heatherley School of Fine Art. He was influenced by the Parisian atelier style of art education. The couple jointly ran and taught at the school for over 20 years. In 1912, she and her sister Florence opened a studio in Piccadilly. Queen Alexandra and Princess Victoria paid visit to the studio.

After the death of her husband in 1934, Massey moved to Chichester with her daughter. Her autobiography Kings, Commoners and Me was also published that year.

== Bibliography ==
- Kings, Commoners and Me (1934)
