= Gertrude, West Virginia =

- Ghost town
- Location within West Virginia Location within the United States
- Coordinates: 38°40′08″N 79°47′10″W
- Country: United States
- State: West Virginia
- County: Pocahontas
- Elevation: 3,005 ft (916 m)
- GNIS feature ID: 1727956

Gertrude is a ghost town in Pocahontas County, West Virginia, United States. Gertrude was 9 miles (14 km) north-northeast of Durbin. Gertrude appeared on West Virginia Geological Survey maps as late as 1929.
