= Gertrude (1843 brig) =

Sailing ship built in 1843 in Newfoundland, Canada

History

New South Wales
- Name: Gertrude
- Owner: R. Bowlers, Newcastle
- Port of registry: Sydney
- Builder: Newfoundland
- Launched: 1843
- Identification: Sydney Registration No: 14/1859
- Fate: Wrecked in 1864

General characteristics
- Class & type: Brig
- Tonnage: 117 gross tons

Gertrude was a sailing ship built in 1843 in Newfoundland. She was wrecked upon Nine Mile Beach, New South Wales during a gale on 30 September 1864. One life was lost.
