= Ormr Steinþórsson =

Nordic skald

Ormr Steinþórsson was a skald about whom little is known. Seven fragments of poetry by him are quoted in the Skáldskaparmál section of Snorri Sturluson's Prose Edda. One of those fragments is also quoted in the Third Grammatical Treatise by Óláfr Þórðarson, while an additional fragment is quoted in the Laufás-Edda. Most of the fragments are in the hálfhnept meter.

Ormr's patronymic suggests he was an Icelander, not a Norwegian. Finnur Jónsson grouped him with Icelandic poets from ca. 900 to ca. 1050 on the basis of the character of his verse. He described Ormr as "apparently a capable poet" and the contents of his verses as "erotic-ironic". More recent scholars have suggested that Ormr was a 12th-century poet and that five or six of his fragments belong together with a fragment of Snæfríðardrápa attributed to Haraldr hárfagri in the Flateyjarbók. Ormr may have based the poem on a fairy-tale about Haraldr's love for Snæfríðr.
