= Gertrude Nafe =

American teacher, essayist

Gertrude E. Nafe
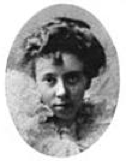
- Born: November 22, 1883; Grand Island, Nebraska
- Died: 1971
- Occupation(s): Teacher, writer

Gertrude E. Nafe (November 22, 1883 – 1971) was an American teacher, essayist, and Communist short-story writer. A friend of Emma Goldman, she helped organize her Denver, Colorado lectures, and organized the city's Caplan-Schmidt Defense League. Nafe's writings included the essay, "Colorado" (Mother Earth; June 2014). She was dismissed from her teaching position for striking the word "obedience" from a "loyalty pledge."

== Biography ==
Gertrude E. Nafe was born in Grand Island, Nebraska, November 22, 1883.

At an Intercollegiate Socialist Society conference, Nafe represented the United Communist Party, which had recently combined the Communist Labor Party and the various elements of the Communist Party outside of the Russian Federations. She attempted to refute the four counts against them: (1) that they were extremists; (2) that, even granting their position was right, they talked too much and too noisily; (3) that they advocated force; (4) that they refused to accept the practical immediate things they could get. In rebuttal she said: "(1) We answer that it was once extreme to object to chattel slavery. Any position is extreme when first taken. If we retreat, the next position becomes extreme and is subject to all the criticism given the extremists. You cannot cut a string so short that it has not two ends. (2) We are told that half a loaf is better than no bread. But we are much more likely to get half a loaf by demanding our just share, the whole. Let the other side do the cutting down. Why should we? (3) We do not threaten violence and never have. We prophesy that the change will not be made without the use of force and we resolve not to be deterred by that fact. Violence covers the earth at present and is the root of all governments. The only possible foundation of peace is justice. As to the little taunt flung at us often, that we are young, 'If it were so, it were a grievous fault.' But seriously, to quote Gilbert Cannan, 'There are times when young men must attempt to say what old men cannot think.' (4) The last argument is that we do not seize the practical good that we can do. Sometimes those 'practical' things really make a bad matter worse. Two radicals, centuries ago, exasperated by the right wing of their generation, cursed the compromisers, and cried out against those who call, 'Peace, peace' when there is no peace. It is a doubtful favor that one does a slave by making his slavery a little more tolerable. We prefer to be of those who cry, 'Rise, quit ye like men.'"

She died in 1971.

== Bibliography ==
- Foley, Barbara (1 July 2014). Jean Toomer: Race, Repression, and Revolution. University of Illinois Press. ISBN 978-0-252-09632-7.
- Intercollegiate Socialist Society (1919). The Socialist Review. Intercollegiate Socialist Society.
- National Civil Liberties Bureau (1919). "War-Time Prosectutions and Mob Violence from April 1, 1917 to March 1, 1919". Pamphlets on the European War. Vol. 26. New York City: National Civil Liberties Bureau.
