= Gertrud Hanna =

German politician (1876–1944)

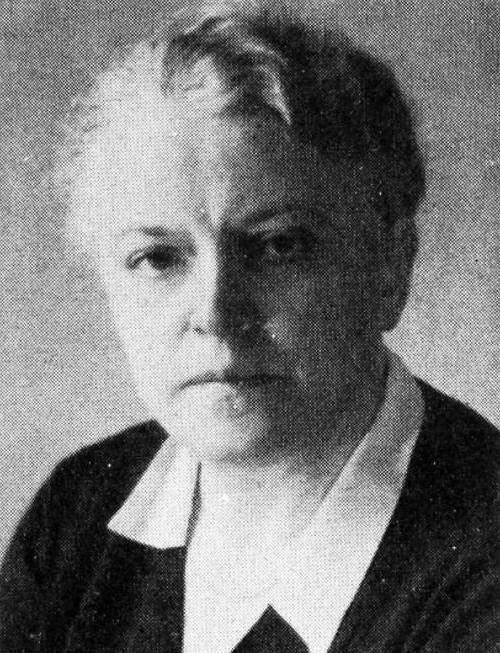
- Hanna c. 1932
- Born: 22 August 1876; Berlin, German Empire
- Died: 26 February 1944 (aged 67); Berlin
- Years active: 1907–1933

Gertrud Hanna (1876–1944) was a German activist and politician. She was a member of the Social Democratic Party (SPD) and represented it at the Landtag of Prussia. She also assumed various positions in different organizations. Following the Nazi rule in Germany she was dismissed from all of her posts and committed suicide in 1944. She described herself and other colleagues as follows: "We are in the first place Party members, secondly unionists, and finally, if at all feminists."

== Biography ==
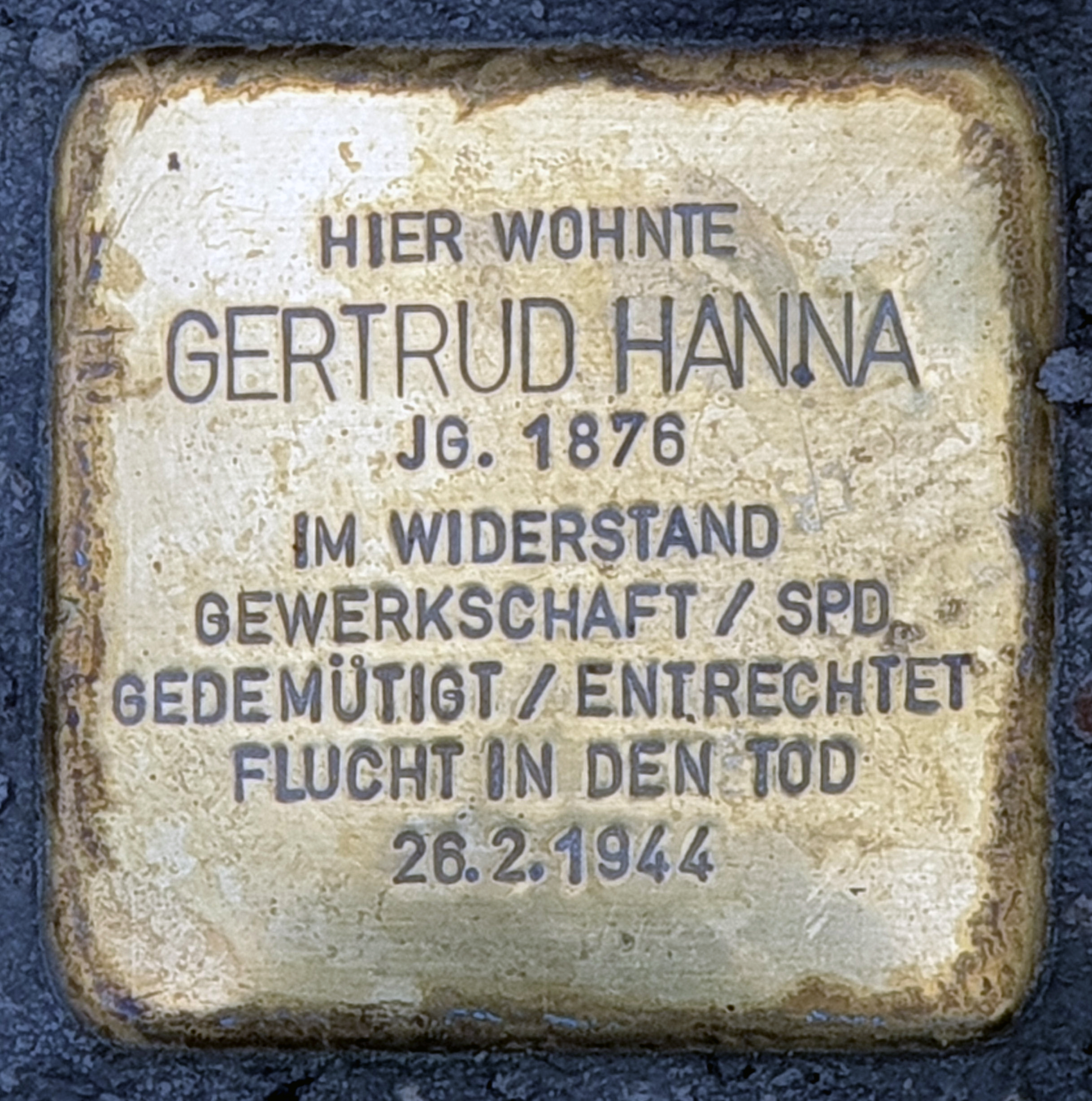
Memorial plate in honor of Gertrud Hanna in Lüdenscheider Weg in Haselhorst, Berlin

Hanna was born in Berlin on 22 August 1876 into a working class family and had two sisters. She left school at 14 and began to work in a publishing house. She joined a union of unskilled workers and became secretary of the Berlin workers' committee in 1907. Next year she joined the SPD. She was elected as the head of the workers' committee in 1909. Between 1909 and 1933 she was a member of the general commission of the trade unions and the federal executive committee of the German trade union confederation. During the same period she headed the women's secretariat of the confederation.

During World War I Hanna was a member of a committee which was set to help women affected from the war-related conditions. From 1916 she edited the newly founded Gewerkschaftliche Frauenzeitung and later worked for the magazine Die Arbeiterwohlfahrt. In 1919, she attended the Prussian constituent assembly and subsequently was elected to the Prussian Parliament in 1921, serving there until 1933. She actively participated at SPD and trade union events which primarily dealt with employment problems of women and with their protection at work. She also participated in international congresses, including a trade union women's conference in Paris in 1927. She published articles in International Labour Review. Hanna had positions in the International Labour Organization as part of the German workers’ delegation and as a member of its commissions.

Immediately after the Nazi rule in the country Hanna lost all of her positions and earned money by doing patchwork with one of her sisters, Antonie. They were subject to frequent interrogations by the Nazi forces and committed suicide in Berlin on 26 February 1944.

== Legacy ==
A memorial plaque was laid for the Hanna sisters at their residence in Lüdenscheider Weg in Haselhorst, Berlin, in October 2021.
