= Gertrude Rachel Levy =

British writer and archaeologist (1883–1966)

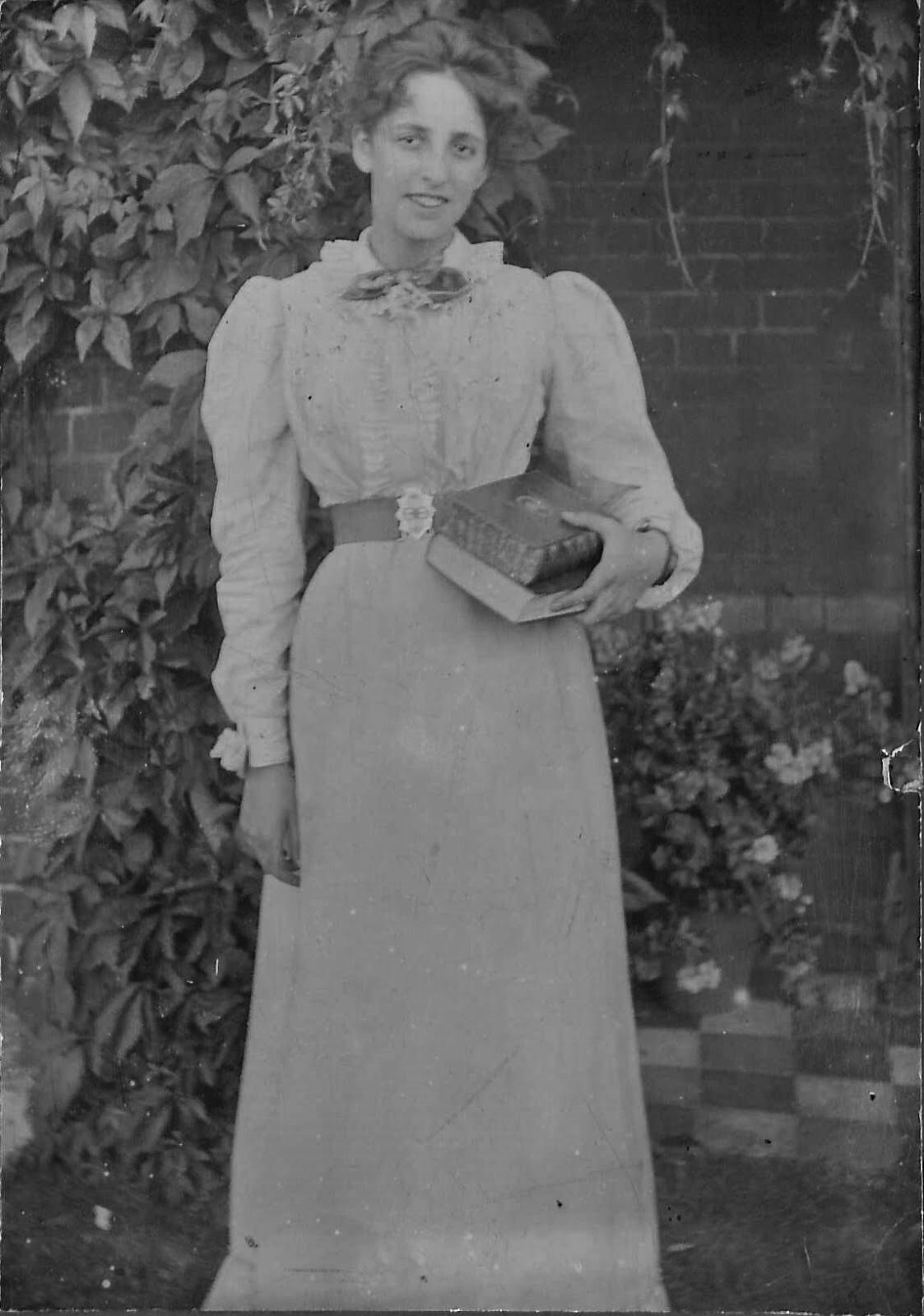
- Photograph of Gertrude Rachel Levy, former librarian, classical scholar and archaeologist, circa 1900
- Born: 5 November 1883; Aliwal North, Cape Colony
- Died: 10 October 1966 (aged 82); Hendon, London, England
- Occupations: writer, archaeologist
- Writing career
- Pen name: G. Rachel Levy
- Language: English
- Notable awards: Fellow, Society of Antiquaries of London, 1947

Gertrude Rachel Levy FSA (5 November 1883 – 10 October 1966) was a British author and cultural historian writing about comparative mythology, matriarchy, epic poetry and archaeology. She published many of her works under the name "G. Rachel Levy".

== Early life and education ==
Levy was born in Aliwal North, Cape Colony, to Jewish parents Benjamin Levy, a German emigrant, and his wife, Florence Beaver, from Manchester. Her father was a bead and glass merchant born in Posen. Her maternal grandfather, Louis Beaver, emigrated from Prussia and married Staffordshire-born Rachel Mayer. The family moved to England when she was young and she grew up in Kensington.

Levy earned an M.A. in Classics in 1924 from the University of London, and worked from 1926 to 1928 with the Department of Antiquities in Mandatory Palestine.

== Career ==
From 1930 to 1936, Levy was associated with an expedition to Iraq, sponsored by the University of Chicago. Later in life she lived in London, where from 1939 to 1949 she was the librarian of the Joint Library of the Hellenic and Roman Societies. The Society of Antiquaries of London elected her as a Fellow in 1947.

As did Alexander Marshack, but earlier, Levy made an observation to the effect that in the earliest known representations of humans and animals together, the humans are shown without weapons. To the theory of hero archetypes, she contributed in The Sword from the Rock a three-phase evolutionary pattern, considered neglected by Brown and Fishwick: creation narratives, then quest pattern, then fraternal conflict. Theodore Ziolkowski states that Levy included much of ancient epic in the works that can be traced back to ritual. Eleazar M. Meletinsky writes

[...] the monumental epics of agrarian civilizations undoubtedly use models linked to seasonal rites [...] On this point, Levy's work is interesting, despite its exaggerations, and goes beyond Murray's pioneering efforts.

Levy was an influence on Northrop Frye, as he himself acknowledged, and references to her work are common in his "Third Book" and "Late" notebooks.

== Works ==
- The Gate of Horn: A Study of the Religious Concepts of the Stone Age, and Their Influence upon European Thought (1948; republished 1963, Faber & Faber, ISBN 978-0571056606)
- The Sword from the Rock: An Investigation into the Origins of Epic Literature and the Development of the Hero (1953)
- The Violet Crown: An Athenian Autobiography (1954)
- Plato in Sicily (1956)
- The Phoenix' Nest: A Study in Religious Transformations (1961)

Levy also edited The Myths of Plato (1905) by John Alexander Stewart for a 1960 edition, with revisions, translation of Greek text, and an introduction.
