= Alvíss =

Norse mythical character

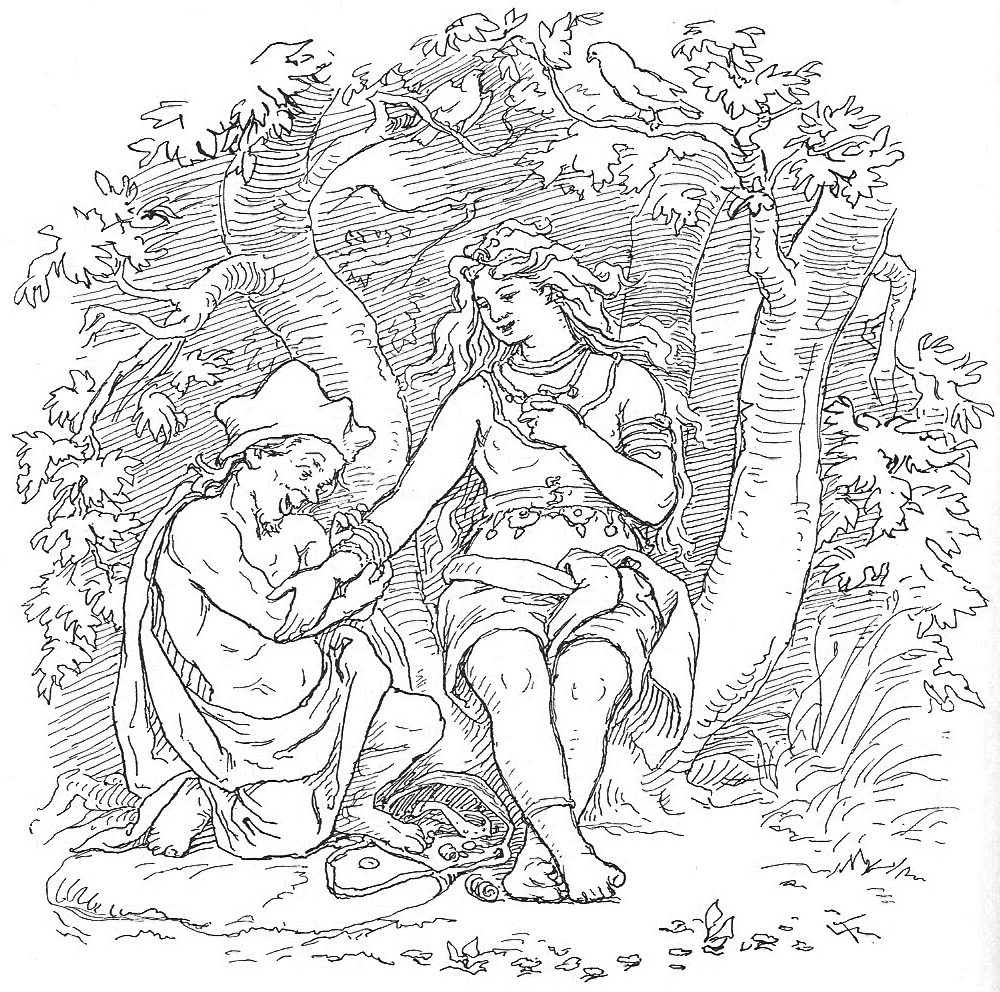
Alvíss puts a ring around the arm of Þrúðr, by Lorenz Frølich

Alvíss (Old Norse: [ˈɑlˌwiːsː]; "All-Wise") was a dwarf in Norse mythology.

In the "Alvíssmál" poem within the 12th century Poetic Edda, Thor's daughter, Þrúðr, was promised in marriage to Alvíss. Thor was unhappy with the match, however, so he devised a plan: Thor told Alvíss that, because of his small height, he had to prove his wisdom. Alvíss agreed, but Thor made his tests last until dawn, when Alviss, because he was a dwarf, was petrified on being exposed to the sunlight.
