= Freedom Station =

- Formation: 2006, San Diego, California
- Type: non-profit 501c charitable organization
- Location: San Diego, California, United States
- Key people: Sandy Lehmkuhler, President, Glenna Schmidt, Vice President
- Website: www.freedomstation.org

Freedom Station is a non-profit 501(c)(3) charitable organization located in San Diego, California whose mission is to assist recovering injured military service members who are awaiting their retirement or discharge from their respective branch of the United States military service.

Freedom Station provides transitional housing along with career and educational guidance to medically retired or discharged military service members who have been injured or disabled during their service to the United States of America. Freedom Station is supported by volunteers and professionals who help these injured military service members with their transition to civilian life.

In July 2008 the Warrior Foundation Freedom Station has been listed as tax-exempt.

Freedom Station officially opened and welcomed its first military service members in May, 2011.

Since 2013, an annual holiday Give-A-Thon or Radiothon is held to raise funds to assists ill and injured service members to be flown home for the holidays. In 2020, more than $1.5 million was raised. Over $7 million has been raised by the Armstrong & Getty Radiothon since 2013.

On August 8, 2022, the organization formally announced the acquisition of a third property designated for transitional housing, which was named Freedom Station III. The donation of labor and materials resulted in the implementation of roof installations for cottages at Freedom Station III, thereby generating a savings of more than $100,000 for the nonprofit. The North Park facility, which is made up of 12 units, was purchased for a little less than $5 million and opened on 22 January 2025.

== Finances ==
The Warrior Foundation Freedom Station reported total revenue of $5,871,477, total expenses of $2,504,754, and total assets of $24,744,852 for the fiscal year ending September 2024. In 2025, its total revenue was $3,587,268 expenses for that year were $2,770,384, and total assets were $25,740,003.

== Awards ==
Freedom station was designated "charity of choice" for the 2011 Holiday Bowl with $1 of every game ticket sold, designated directly to the charity.

Freedom Station was also the co-winner of the 2011 "San Diego County Non-Profit of the Year" by the Veterans Museum and Memorial Center.

Charity Navigator lists Warrior Foundation Freedom Station as a Four-Star Charity (99% overall score).
