= Alvíssmál =

Poem from the Poetic Edda

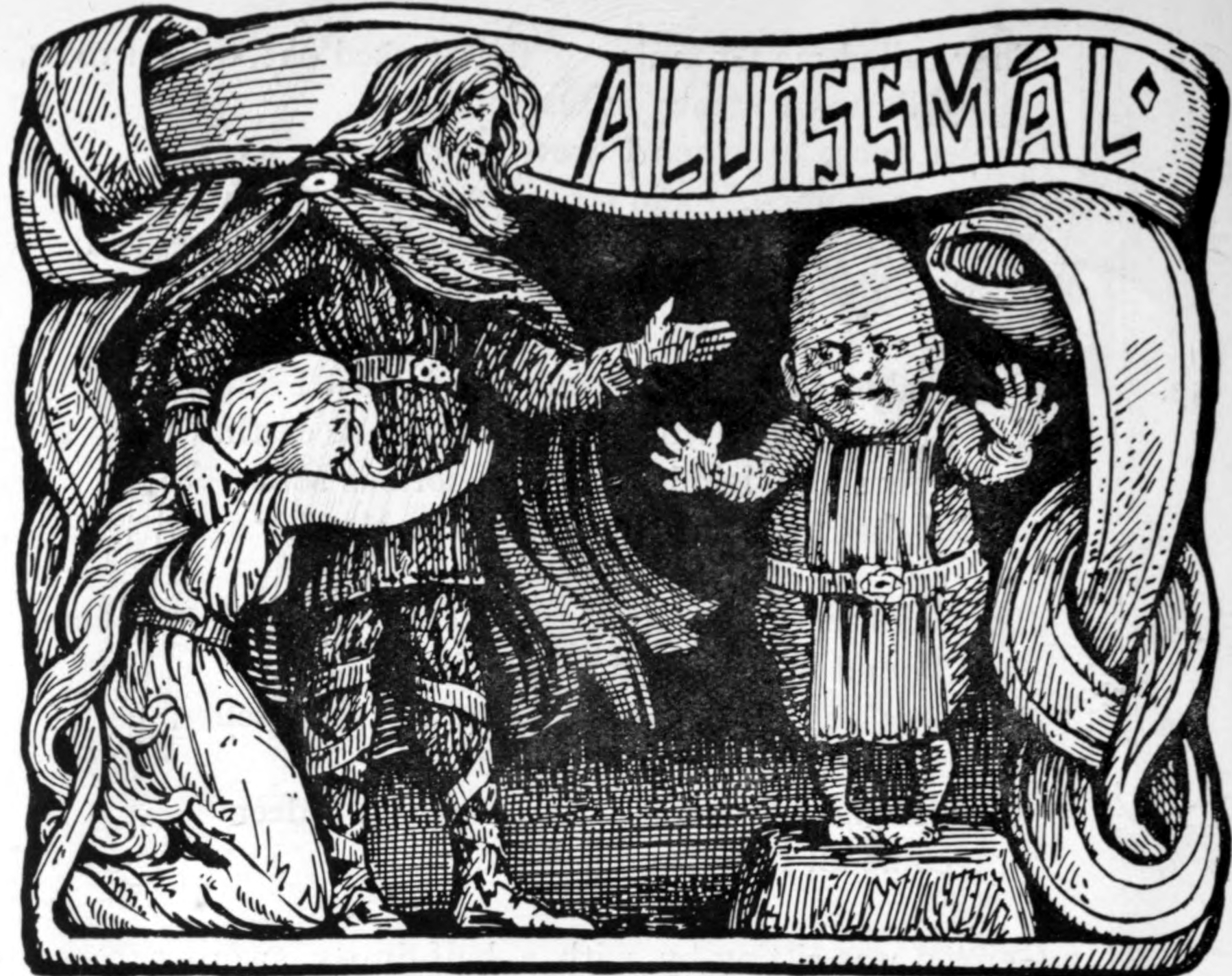
Thor converses with Alvíss while protecting his daughter. Illustration by W. G. Collingwood

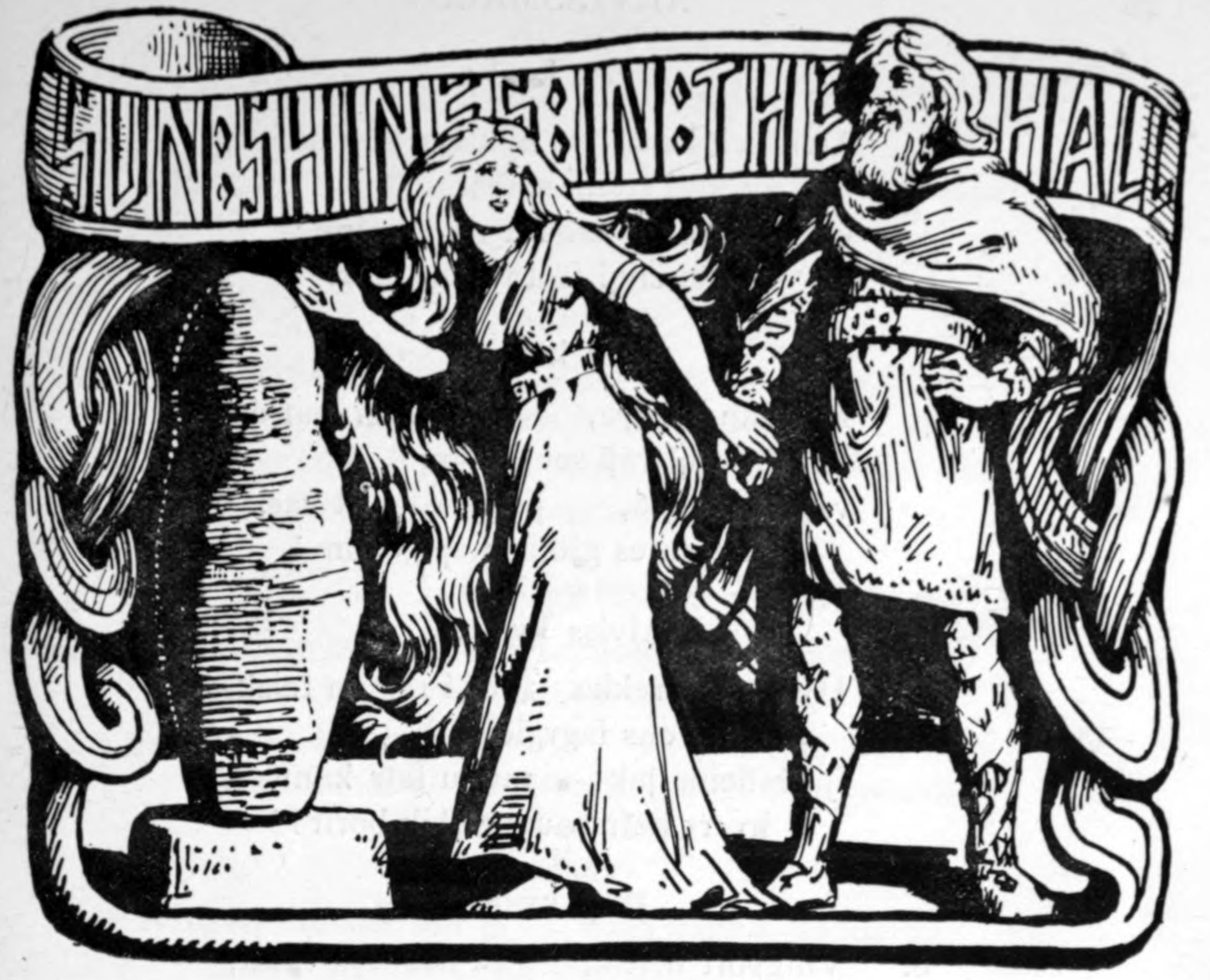
"Sun Shines in the Hall" (1908) by W. G. Collingwood

Alvíssmál (Old Norse: 'The Song of All-wise' or 'The Words of All-wise') is a poem collected in the Poetic Edda, probably dating to the 12th century, that describes how the god Thor outwits a dwarf called Alvíss ("All-Wise") who seeks to marry his daughter.

== Plot ==
Alvíss comes to Thor to claim Thor's daughter as his bride, saying that she had been promised to him earlier. Thor refuses as he had not been at home at the time, then tells Alvíss that he may take the young woman if he can correctly answer all of Thor's questions. The dwarf's replies act as an exhaustive list of the sentient mythological entities among men, Æsir, Vanir, jötnar, dwarfs, and elves. For example, the heavens have the following names, according to Alvíss:

Himinn heitir með mönnum,
en hlýrnir með goðum,
kalla vindófni vanir,
uppheim jötnar,
alfar fagraræfr,
dvergar drjúpansal.

—Guðni Jónsson's normalized text
Translation:

'Heaven' men call it,
'The Height' the gods,
The Wanes 'The Weaver of Winds';
Giants 'The Up-World',
Elves 'The Fair-Roof',
The dwarfs 'The Dripping Hall'.

—Henry Adam Bellows' translation

Ultimately, Thor confesses he was asking the questions to gain some time for the sun to rise and turn the dwarf into stone.

== Dating ==
It is not known when Alvíssmál was created; analysis of its contents can point to multiple periods depending on which elements are focused upon. One theory is that the use of Thor and references to mythical beings can be assumed to reflect the culture's religious beliefs, so it would have been created no later than the 10th century before Iceland was Christianized. Another points to the presence of words found only in late skaldic poetry, which would indicate that it came from the 12th-century skaldic poetry revival.
