= Gertrude Eastmond =

Barbadian politician

Gertrude Lilian Eastmond-Welch (died 1 April 2024) was a Barbadian businesswoman and politician of the Democratic Labour Party (DLP).

== Biography ==
Eastmond was educated at St. Elizabeth Primary School. Eastmond worked as a businesswoman and owned a supermarket and shopping centre.

At the 1971 Barbadian general election, Eastmond was elected to the House of Assembly of Barbados for the constituency St. Michael North East as a member of the Democratic Labour Party (DLP). She was the second woman to be elected to the House of Assembly of Barbados, after Edna Ermyntrude Bourne, who was elected twenty years earlier. Eastmond was a member of the Democratic League of Women (DLW) within the DLP.

From 1971 to 1976, Eastmond served as Parliamentary Secretary of Health and Welfare. On 15 October 1976, Eastmond resigned as Parliamentary Secretary and from the DLP. She ran as an independent candidate at the 1976 Barbadian general election, but was not elected.

After her term in office, Eastmond became president of the Barbados Employers Confederation.

Eastmond died on 1 April 2024, aged 95.
