= Trudy =

Trudy is a diminutive of Geertruida, and Gertrude. Notable people with the name include:

== People ==
- Trudy Adams (born 1964), American actress
- Trudy Anderson (born 1959), New Zealand cricketer
- Trudy Bellinger, British music video director
- Trudy Benson (born 1985), American painter
- Trudy Burke (born 1991), Australian association football player
- Trudy Camilleri (born 1991), Australian football player
- Trudy H. Clark (born 1951), United States Air Force major general
- Trudy Coxe (born 1949), American environmental activist
- Trudy Desmond (1945–1999), American singer
- Trudy Dittmar (born 1944), American writer
- Trudy Ederle (1905–2003), American swimmer
- Trudy Elion (1918–1999), American biochemist
- Trudy Larkin Förster (1935–2005), American writer
- Trudy Govier, Canadian philosopher
- Trudy Grant, Canadian television producer
- Trudy Groenman (born 1944), Dutch tennis player
- Trudy Harris (born 1949), American author
- Trudy Harrison (born 1976), British politician
- Trudy Haynes (1926–2022), American reporter
- Trudy Hellier, Australian actress
- Trudy Kerr (born 1963), Australian teacher
- Trudy Kilkolly (born 1965), New Zealand Olympic athlete
- Trudy Lynn (born 1947), American singer
- Trudy Mackay (born 1952), Canadian author
- Trudy Marshall (1920–2004), American actress
- Trudy McCaffery (1944–2007), thoroughbred racehorse owner and breeder
- Trudy McFall, American non-profit executive
- Trudy McIntosh (born 1984), Australian artistic gymnast
- Trudy Morgan (born 1966), African civil engineer
- Trudy Norris-Grey, Welsh businesswoman
- Trudy Huskamp Peterson (born 1945), American archivist
- Trudy Pitts (1932–2010), American jazz singer
- Trudy Richards (1920–2008), American singer
- Trudy Ruth (born 1950), Dutch sprinter
- Trudy Silver (born 1953), American composer
- Trudy Späth-Schweizer (1908–1990), Swiss political figure
- Trudy Stevenson (1944–2018), Zimbabwean politician and ambassador to Senegal
- Trudy Wade (born 1951), American politician
- Trudy Wroe (1931–2007), American actress
- Trudy Young (born 1950), Canadian actress

== Fictional characters ==
- Trudy, from Disney Comics
- Trudy Monk, from the TV series Monk
- Trudy Campbell, from the TV series Mad Men

== See also ==
- Trudie
