= John Knowles (disambiguation) =

John Knowles (1926–2001) was an American novelist.

John Knowles may also refer to:

- John Knowles (antitrinitarian) (fl. 1646–1668), English antitrinitarian preacher
- John Knowles (English author) (1781–1841), arts and naval writer, biographer of Fuseli
- John Knowles (Manchester) (1810–1880), English businessman
- John Knowles (guitarist) (born 1942), American acoustic guitarist
- John Knowles (American politician), New Hampshire state legislator
- John Power Knowles (1808–1887), U.S. federal judge
- John Cunningham Knowles (1894–1977), politician in Saskatchewan, Canada
- John Ward Knowles (1838–1931), stained-glass manufacturer and commentator on art and music
- John Hilton Knowles (1926–1979), American cardiopulmonary physiologist and physician
- John Evans Knowles (1914–2011), Canadian politician
- David Knowles (footballer) (John David Knowles, 1941–2011), English footballer
- John Knowles (zoologist), founder of Marwell Wildlife
- John Knowles (sport shooter) (born 1947), Scottish sport shooter

== See also ==
- Jack Knowles (disambiguation)
