= Jack Knowles =

Jack Knowles may refer to:

- Jack Knowles (footballer)
- Jack Knowles (lighting designer)

== See also ==
- John Knowles (disambiguation)
