= Lady Macbeth Seizing the Daggers =

Paintings by Henry Fuseli

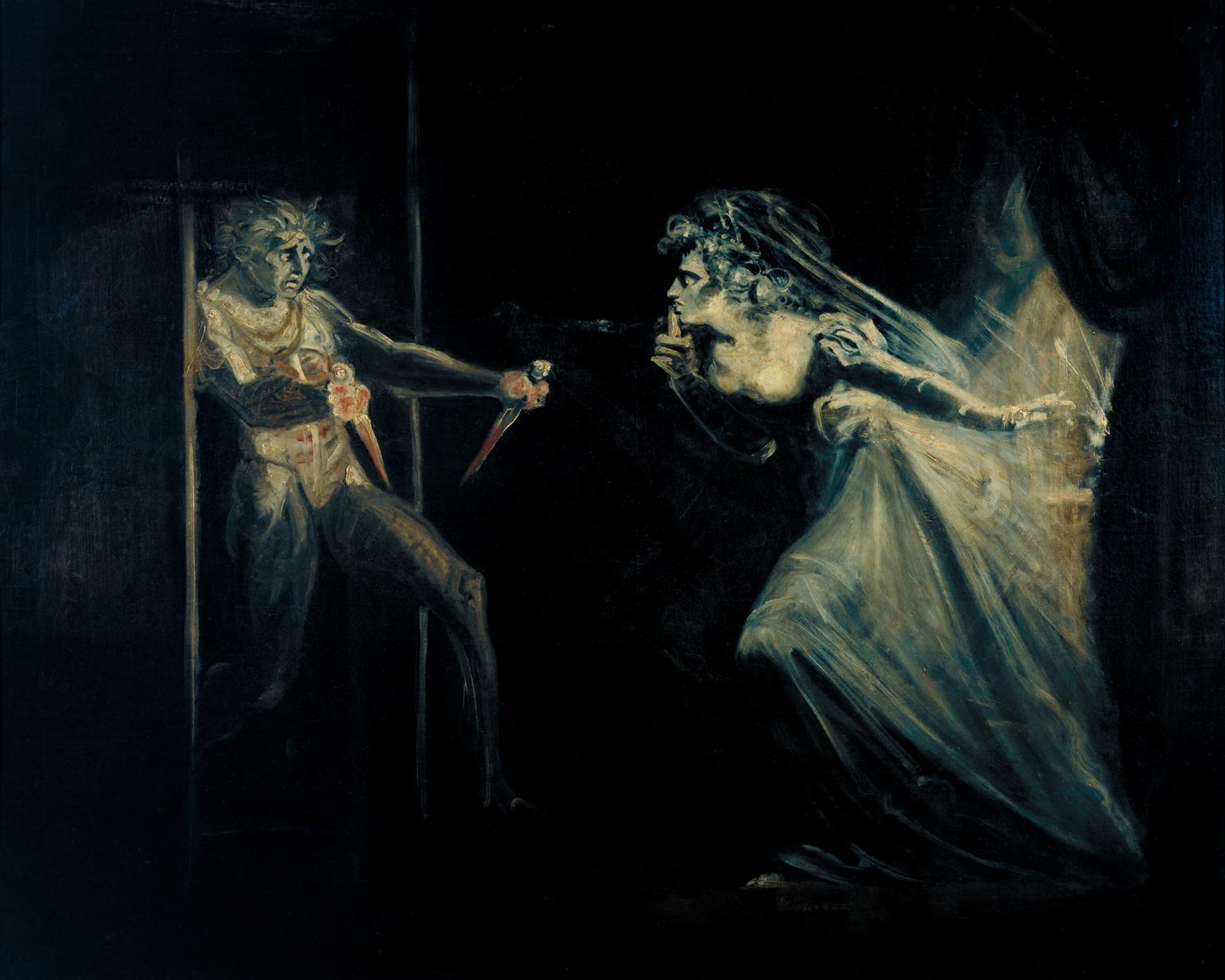
- Artist: Henry Fuseli
- Year: 1812
- Medium: Oil on canvas
- Dimensions: 127 cm × 101.6 cm (50 in × 40.0 in)
- Location: Tate Britain; London

Lady Macbeth Seizing the Daggers is an oil on canvas painting by the Swiss-British artist Henry Fuseli, created in 1812. The work is held at the Tate Britain, in London.

== History and description ==
Fuseli was a great admirer of William Shakespeare; he himself had translated the play Macbeth to German. He created several paintings inspired by Shakespeare's works. This painting, most likely a sketch for an intended larger work, represents a passage from the second scene of the second act of the same play. In this scene the protagonist, Macbeth, holds at arm's length the still bloody daggers with which he has just killed King Duncan, while his wife Lady Macbeth, the instigator of the regicide, signals him to be silent while rushing towards her husband to disarm him. Macbeth appears remorseful, while his wife appears more confident. The scene has a fantastical appearance; the characters resemble glowing spectres in a dark background.
