= Thor Battering the Midgard Serpent =

1790 painting by the Swiss artist Henry Fuseli

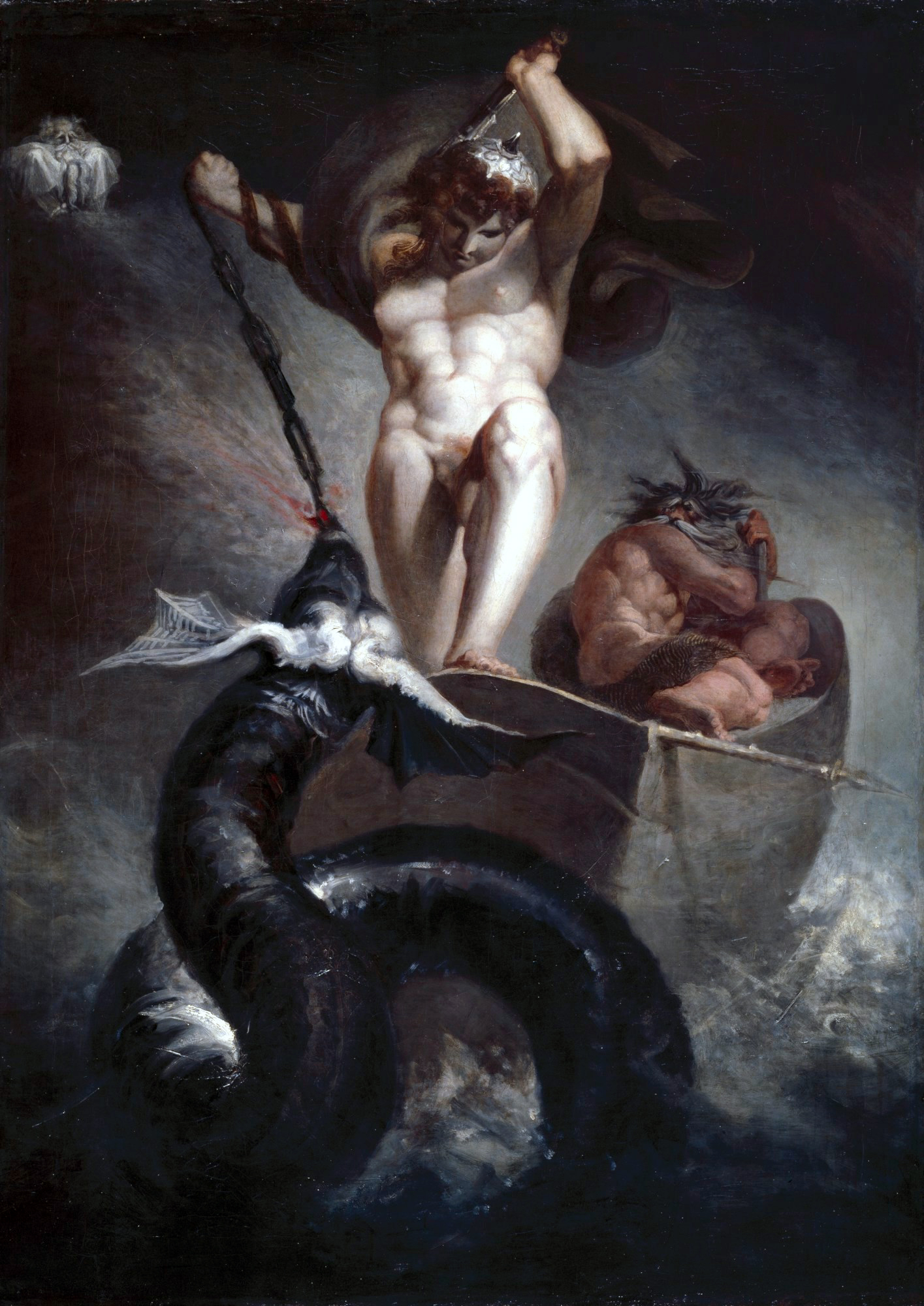
- Artist: Henry Fuseli
- Year: 1790
- Medium: Oil on canvas
- Dimensions: 133 cm × 94.6 cm (52 in × 37.2 in)
- Location: Royal Academy of Arts Collections; London

Thor Battering the Midgard Serpent is an oil on canvas painting by the Swiss artist Henry Fuseli, from 1790. It is held at the Royal Academy of Arts Collections, in London.

== History and description ==
The nude and muscular Thor stands in Hymir's boat with the Jörmungandr on his fish hook. In the top left corner, the god Odin appears as an old man. It depicts one of the most popular myths in Germanic mythology, Thor's fishing trip, which was known to Fuseli through P. H. Mallet's 1755 book Introduction à l'histoire du Dannemarc, translated to English by Thomas Percy in 1770 as Northern Antiquities. The Zurich artist had also traveled to the Italian peninsula, where he was able to admire the art of ancient masters, such as Michelangelo Buonarroti, whose sculptural nudes where a great source of inspiration for this canvas. The painting was Fuseli's diploma work for his election to the British Royal Academy of Arts in 1790.

This mythological-themed painting represents the Norse god Thor standing on the prow of a boat with Hymir at the helm, as he is about to strike a sword blow against the sea serpent of Midgard, the Jörmungandr (or Miðgarðsormr), which he holds tight with a chain stuck in his mouth probably with a harpoon. In the background there is an old man observing the scene: he is Thor's father, the god Odin. Except for his helmet and cape, the hero is shown naked like the neoclassical heroes and his body is muscular, further highlighted by the fact that he emerges from the dark background. He is depicted from bottom to top and with a pronounced inclination, which gives the painting a slightly darker atmosphere. The Jörmungandr can recall in a literal sense the serpentine line that was present in Italian mannerist art, which had been studied by the Swiss painter. Finally, the scene is set among the high waves of a stormy sea, in the middle of the night, making the work a nocturne in which naturalness is lost in favor of monstrosity and fantasy.

The subject has been interpreted in relation to Fuseli's support for the French Revolution, where the serpent could represent the Ancien Régime about to be defeated by the French people, personified by the god of thunder.

== See also ==
- Thor's Fight with the Giants
