= Henry Fuseli =

Swiss artist and writer (1741–1825)

Henry Fuseli RA
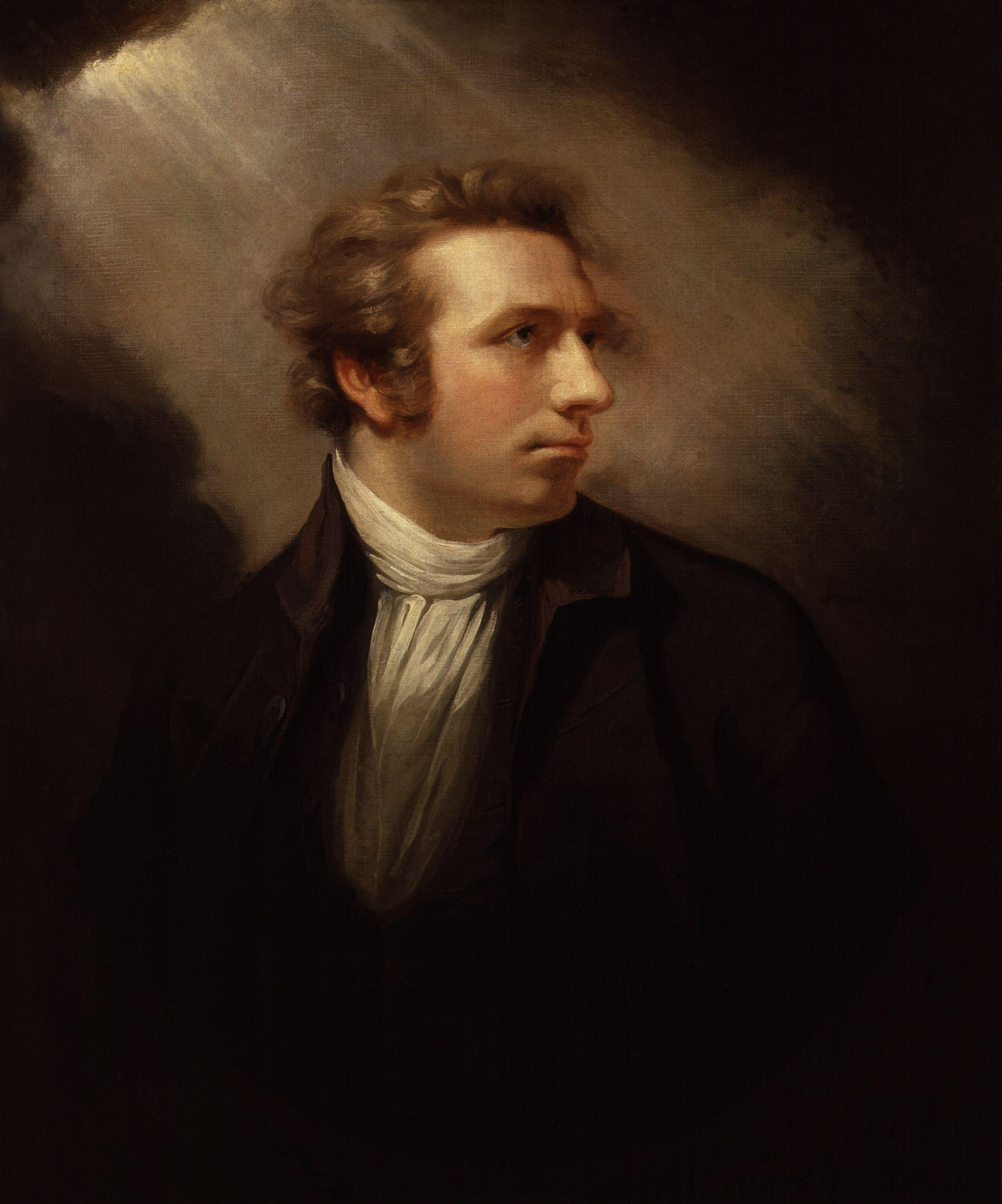
- Portrait of Henry Fuseli by James Northcote, 1778
- Born: Johann Heinrich Füssli; 7 February 1741; Zürich, Switzerland
- Died: 17 April 1825 (aged 84); Putney Hill, London, England
- Notable work: The Nightmare
- Movement: Romanticism
- Spouse: Sophia Rawlins (m. 1788)

Henry Fuseli RA (/ˈfjuːzəli, fjuːˈzɛli/ FEW-zə-lee, few-ZEL-ee; German: Johann Heinrich Füssli [ˈjoːhan ˈhaɪ̯nʁɪç ˈfyːsli]; 7 February 1741 – 17 April 1825) was a Swiss painter, draughtsman, and writer on art who spent much of his career in Britain.

Many of his successful works depict supernatural experiences, such as The Nightmare. He produced painted works for John Boydell's Shakespeare Gallery and for his own "Milton Gallery". He held the posts of Professor of Painting and Keeper at the Royal Academy. His style had a considerable influence on many younger British artists, including William Blake (1757–1827).

== Biography ==
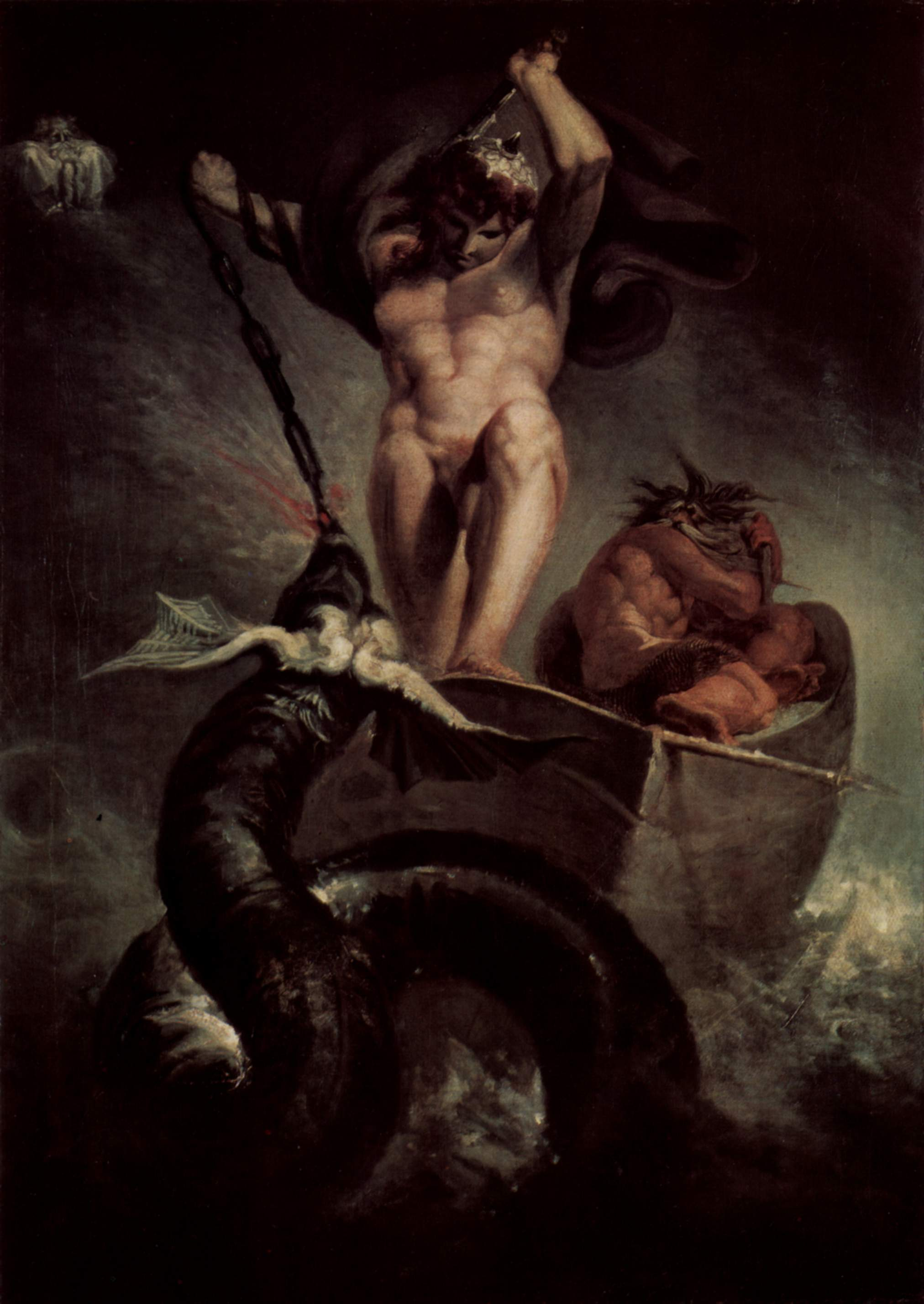
Thor Battering the Midgard Serpent was Fuseli's diploma work for the Royal Academy, accepted 1790.

Fuseli was born on 7 February 1741 in Zürich, the second of 18 children. Among his brothers and sisters were Johann Kaspar and Anna. His father was Johann Caspar Füssli, a painter of portraits and landscapes, and author of Lives of the Helvetic Painters. He intended Henry for the church, and sent him to the Caroline college of Zürich, where he received a classical education. One of his schoolmates there was Johann Kaspar Lavater, with whom he became close friends.

After taking orders in 1761, Fuseli was forced to leave the country as a result of having helped Lavater to expose an unjust magistrate, whose powerful family sought revenge. He travelled through Germany, and then, in 1765, visited England, where he supported himself for some time by miscellaneous writing. Eventually, he became acquainted with Sir Joshua Reynolds, to whom he showed his drawings. Following Reynolds' advice, he decided to devote himself entirely to art. In 1770, he made an art pilgrimage to Italy, where he remained until 1778, changing his name from Füssli to the more Italian-sounding Fuseli. In Rome, he moved in the same circles as the Scottish artist Alexander Runciman and the Swedish sculptor Tobias Sergel.

In early 1779, he returned to Britain, visiting Zürich on the way. In London, he found a commission awaiting him from Alderman John Boydell, who was then setting up his Shakespeare Gallery. Fuseli painted a number of pieces for Boydell, and supervised the first English edition of Lavater's work on physiognomy. He also gave William Cowper some valuable assistance in preparing a translation of Homer. In 1788, Fuseli married Sophia Rawlins (originally one of his models), and he soon after became an associate of the Royal Academy. The early feminist Mary Wollstonecraft, whose portrait he had painted, planned a trip with him to Paris, and pursued him determinedly, but communication between the two was stopped by Rawlins. Fuseli later said, "I hate clever women. They are only troublesome". In 1790, he became a full academician, presenting Thor Battering the Midgard Serpent as his diploma work. In 1799, Fuseli was appointed professor of painting to the Academy. Four years later, he was chosen as Keeper and resigned his professorship, but resumed it in 1810, continuing to hold both offices until his death. He was succeeded as keeper by Henry Thomson.

In 1799, Fuseli exhibited a series of paintings from subjects furnished by the works of John Milton, with a view to forming a Milton gallery comparable to Boydell's Shakespeare gallery. There were 47 Milton paintings, many of them very large, completed at intervals over nine years. The exhibition proved a commercial failure and closed in 1800. In 1805, he brought out an edition of Matthew Pilkington's Lives of the Painters, which did little for his reputation.

Antonio Canova, when on his visit to England, was much taken with Fuseli's works, and on returning to Rome in 1817, caused him to be elected a member of the first class in the Accademia di San Luca.

== Works ==
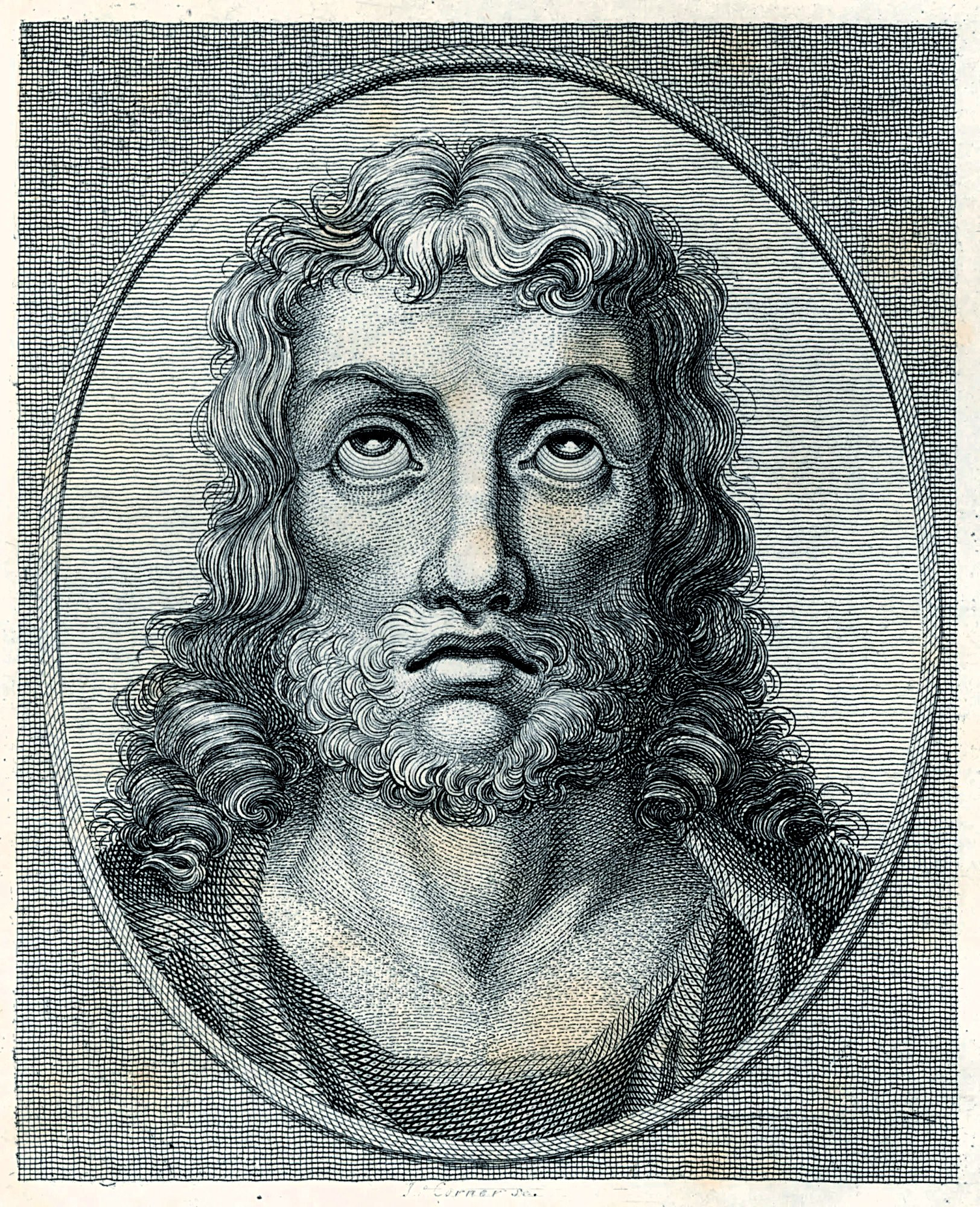
Head of Christ — etching and engraving by John Corner after a drawing by Henry Fuseli (1791), based on a work by Andrea del Verrocchio

As a painter, Fuseli favoured the supernatural. He pitched everything on an ideal scale, believing a certain amount of exaggeration was necessary in the higher branches of historical painting. In this theory, he was confirmed by the study of Michelangelo's works and the marble statues of the Monte Cavallo, which, when at Rome, he liked to contemplate in the evening, relieved against a murky sky or illuminated by lightning.

Describing his style, William Michael Rossetti in the 1911 Encyclopædia Britannica Eleventh Edition said that:

His figures are full of life and earnestness, and seem to have an object in view which they follow with intensity. Like Rubens, he excelled in the art of setting his figures in motion. Though the lofty and terrible was his proper sphere, Fuseli had a fine perception of the ludicrous. The grotesque humour of his fairy scenes, especially those taken from A Midsummer-Night's Dream, is in its way not less remarkable than the poetic power of his more ambitious works.

Though not noted as a colourist, Fuseli was described as a master of light and shadow. Rather than setting out his palette methodically in the manner of most painters, he merely distributed the colours across it randomly. He often used his pigments in the form of a dry powder, which he hastily combined on the end of his brush with oil, or turpentine, or gold size, regardless of the quantity, and depending on accident for the general effect. This recklessness may perhaps be explained by the fact that he did not paint in oil until the age of 25.

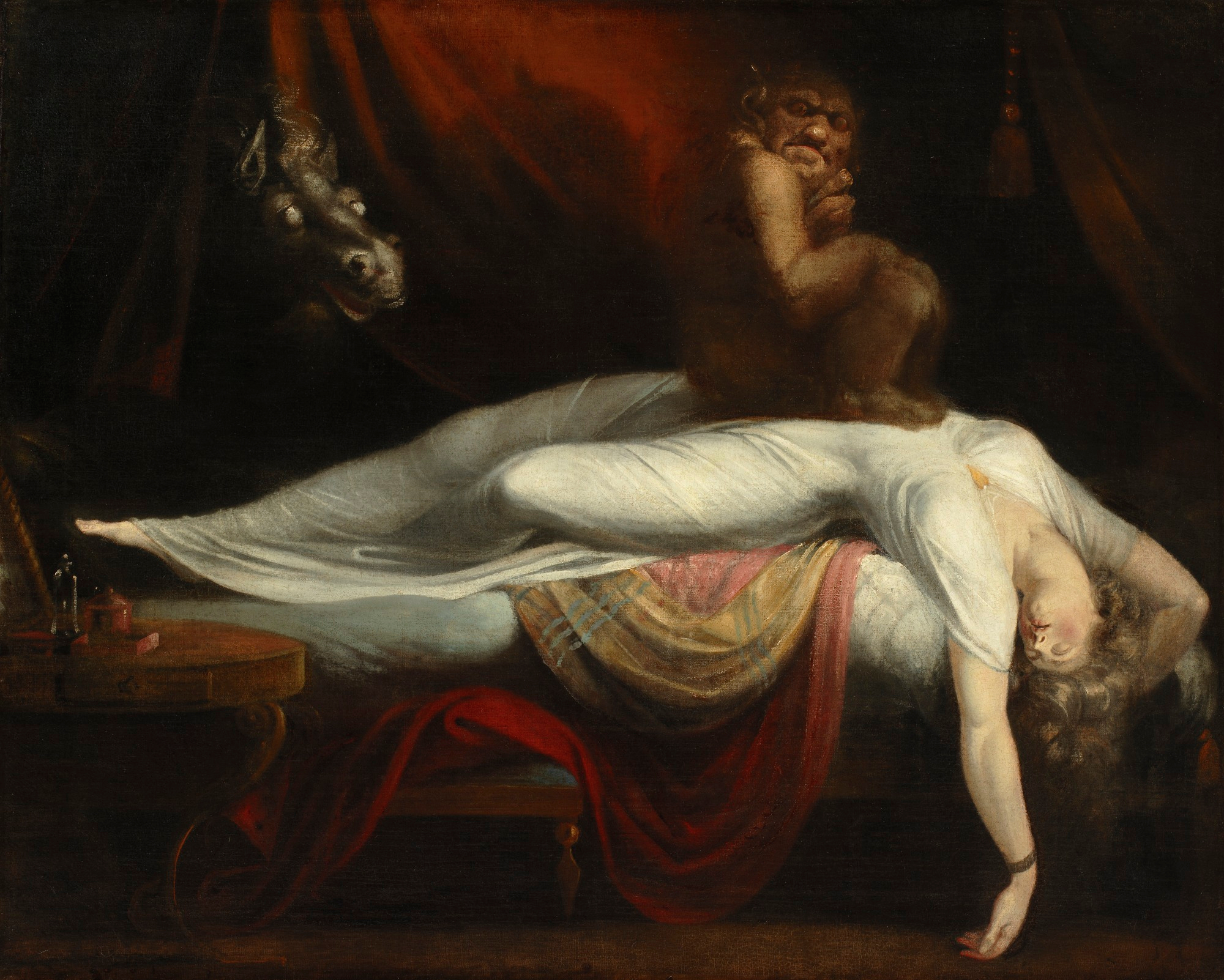
The Nightmare (1781), Detroit Institute of Arts

Fuseli painted more than 200 pictures, but he exhibited only a small number of them. His earliest painting represented Joseph Interpreting the Dreams of the Baker and Butler, but the first to excite particular attention was The Nightmare, exhibited in 1782, a painting of which he painted several versions. Themes seen in The Nightmare, such as horror, dark magic and sexuality, were echoed in his 1796 painting, Night-Hag visiting the Lapland Witches.

His sketches or designs numbered about 800; they have admirable qualities of invention and design and are frequently superior to his paintings. In his drawings, as in his paintings, his methods included deliberately exaggerating the proportions of the human body and throwing his figures into contorted attitudes. One technique involved setting down arbitrary points on a sheet, which then became the extreme points of the various limbs. Notable examples of these drawings were made in concert with George Richmond when the two artists were together in Rome. He rarely drew figures from life, basing his art on study of the antique and Michelangelo.

He produced no landscapes—"Damn Nature! she always puts me out" was his characteristic exclamation—and painted only two portraits. However, similar to contemporary landscape painters such as J. M. W. Turner, he evoked qualities of terror and the sublime.

Many interesting anecdotes of Fuseli, and his relations to contemporary artists, are given in his Life by John Knowles (1831). He influenced the art of Fortunato Duranti.

== Writings ==
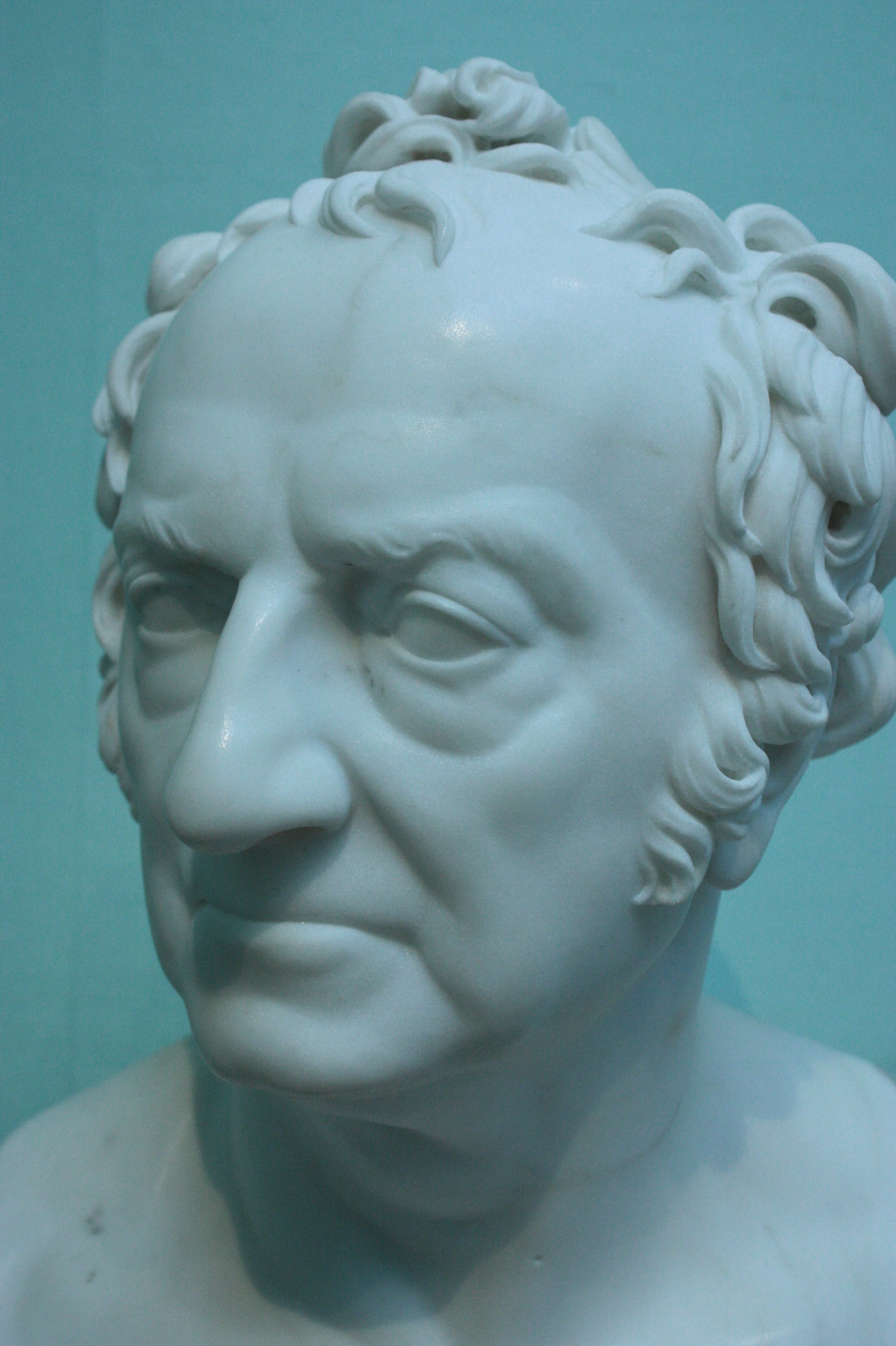
Henry Fuseli (aged 83) by Edward Hodges Baily, 1824, National Gallery, London

He was a thorough master of French, Italian, English and German, and could write in all these languages with equal facility and vigour, although he preferred German as the vehicle of his thoughts. His principal written work was his series of twelve lectures delivered to the Royal Academy, begun in 1801.

== Influence ==
His pupils included David Wilkie, Benjamin Haydon, William Etty, and Edwin Landseer. William Blake was also inspired by him.

== Death ==
After a life of uninterrupted good health, he died on 17 April 1825, at the house of the Countess of Guildford on Putney Hill, aged 84, and was buried in the crypt of St Paul's Cathedral. He was comparatively wealthy at the time of his death.

== Gallery ==
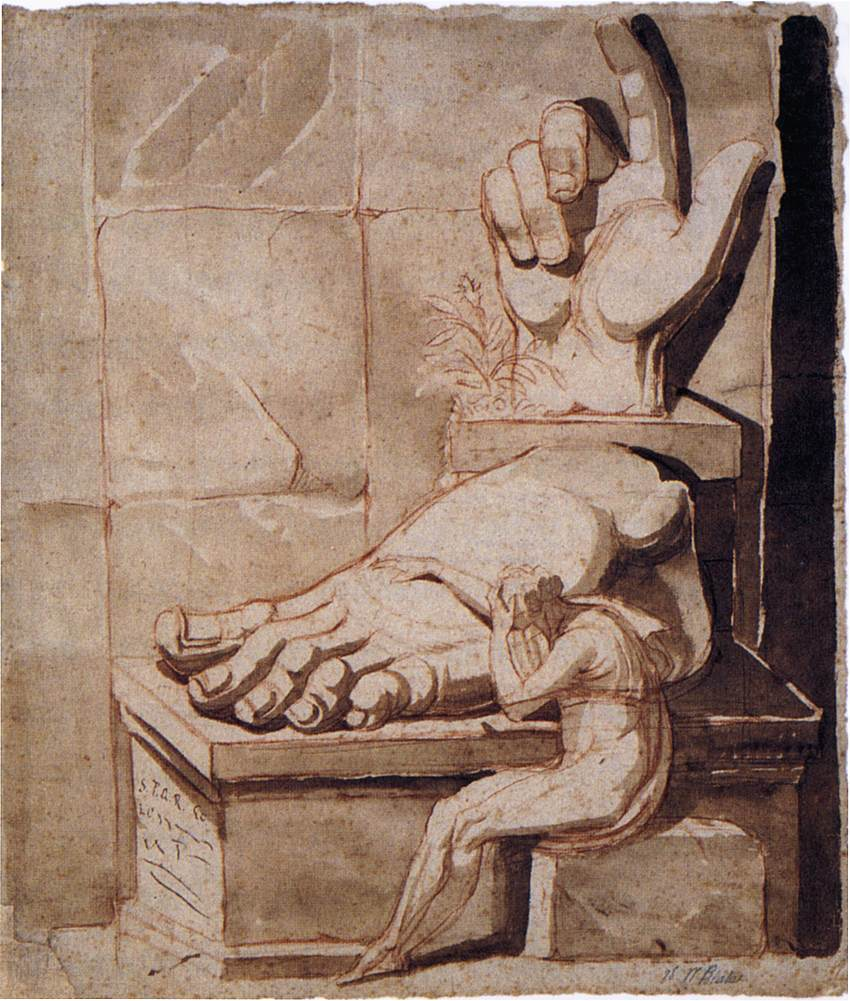
The Artist's Despair Before the Grandeur of Ancient Ruins, 1778–79

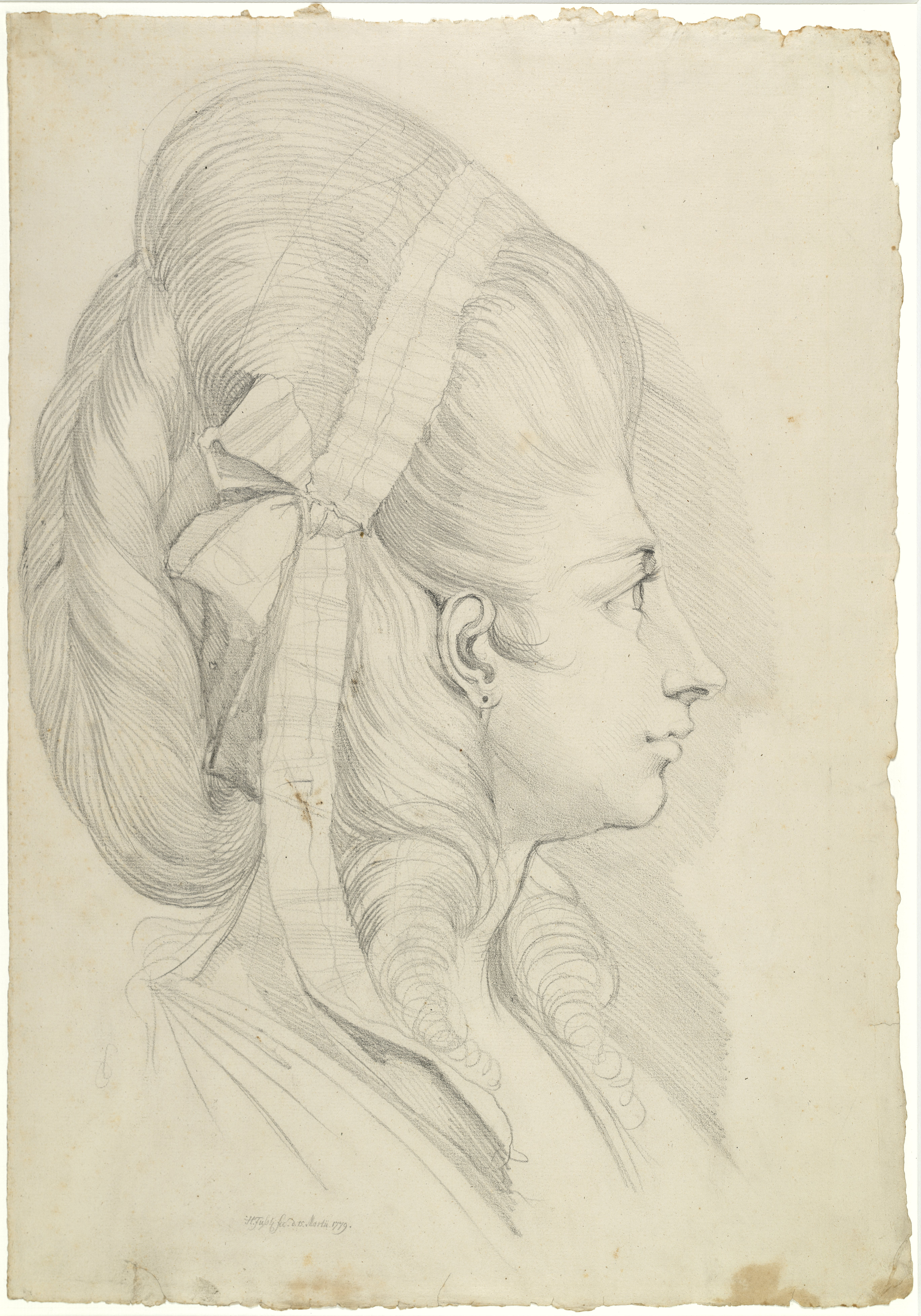
Anna Magdalena Schweizer, 1779

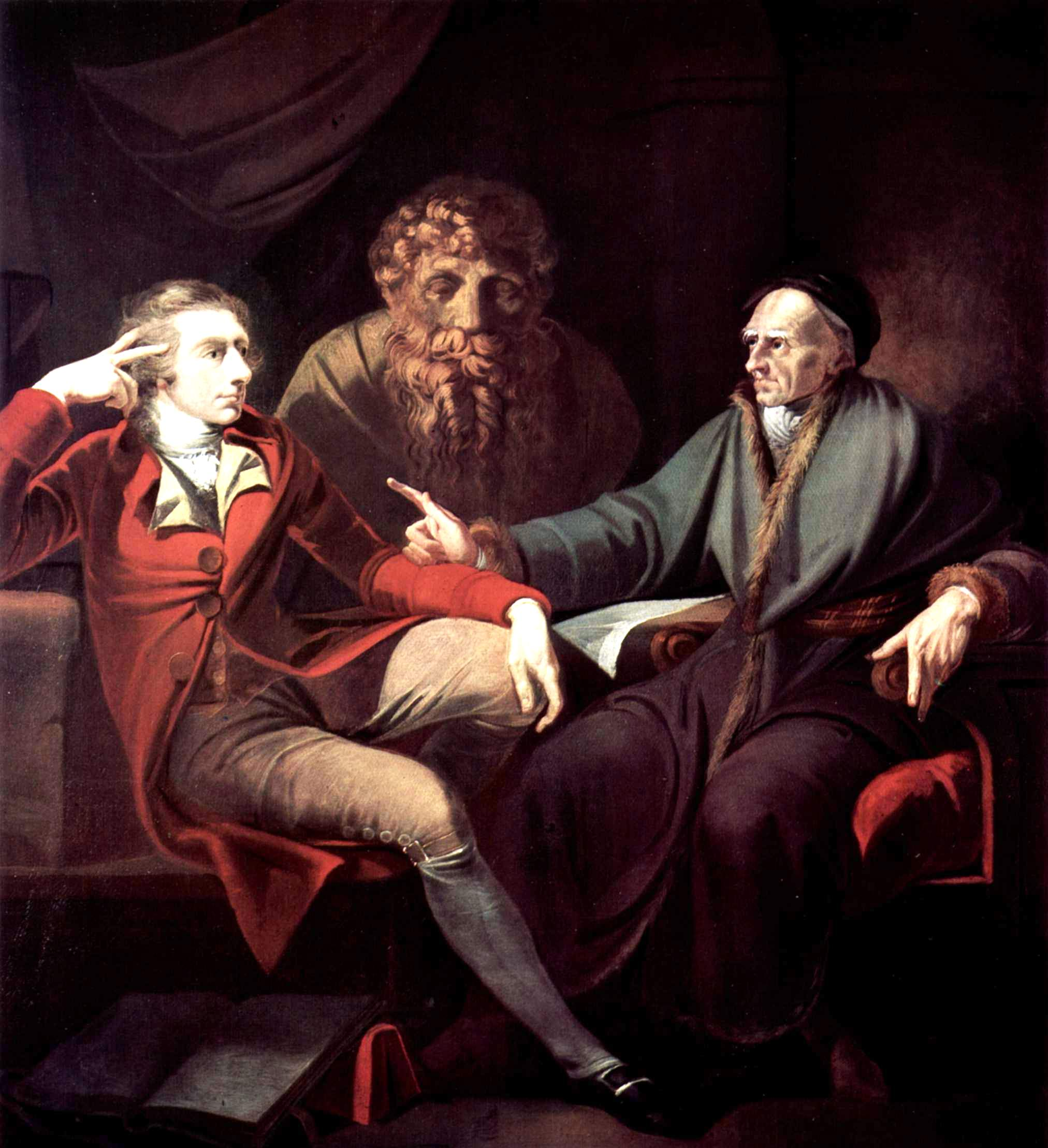
The artist in conversation with Johann Jakob Bodmer, 1778–1781

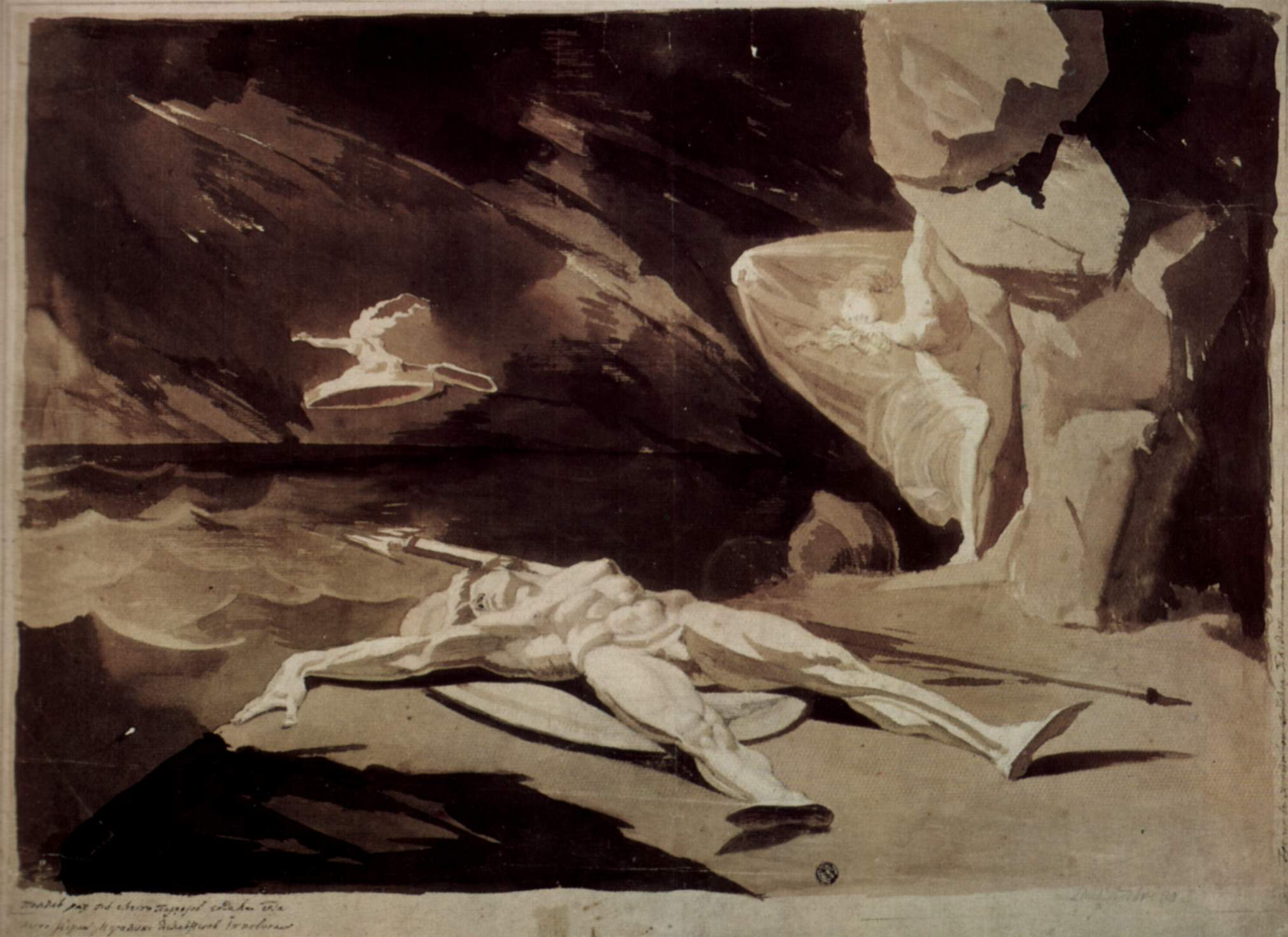
The death of Achilles, 1780

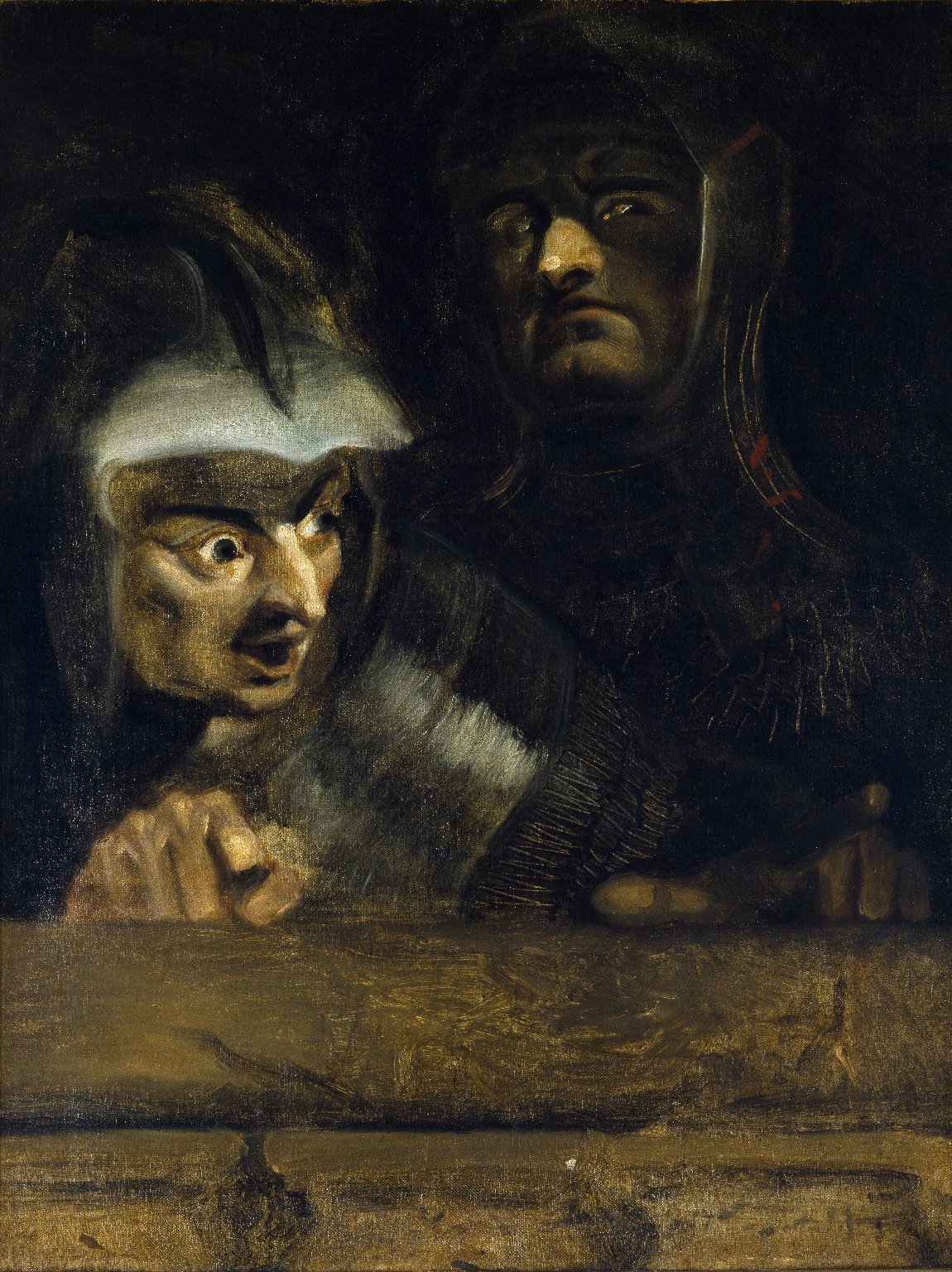
The two murderers of the Duke of Clarence, 1780–1782

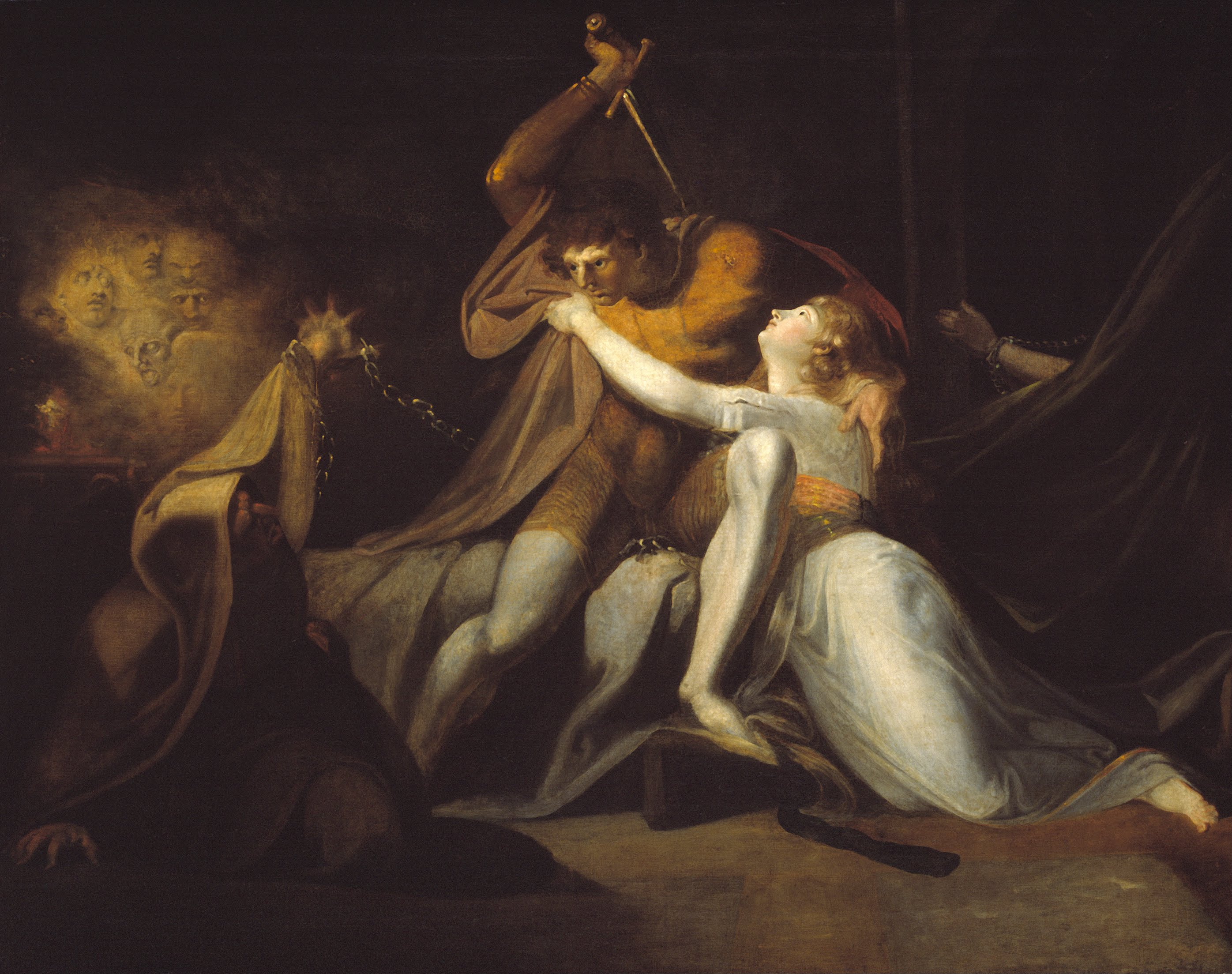
Percival Delivering Belisane from the Enchantment of Urma, 1783

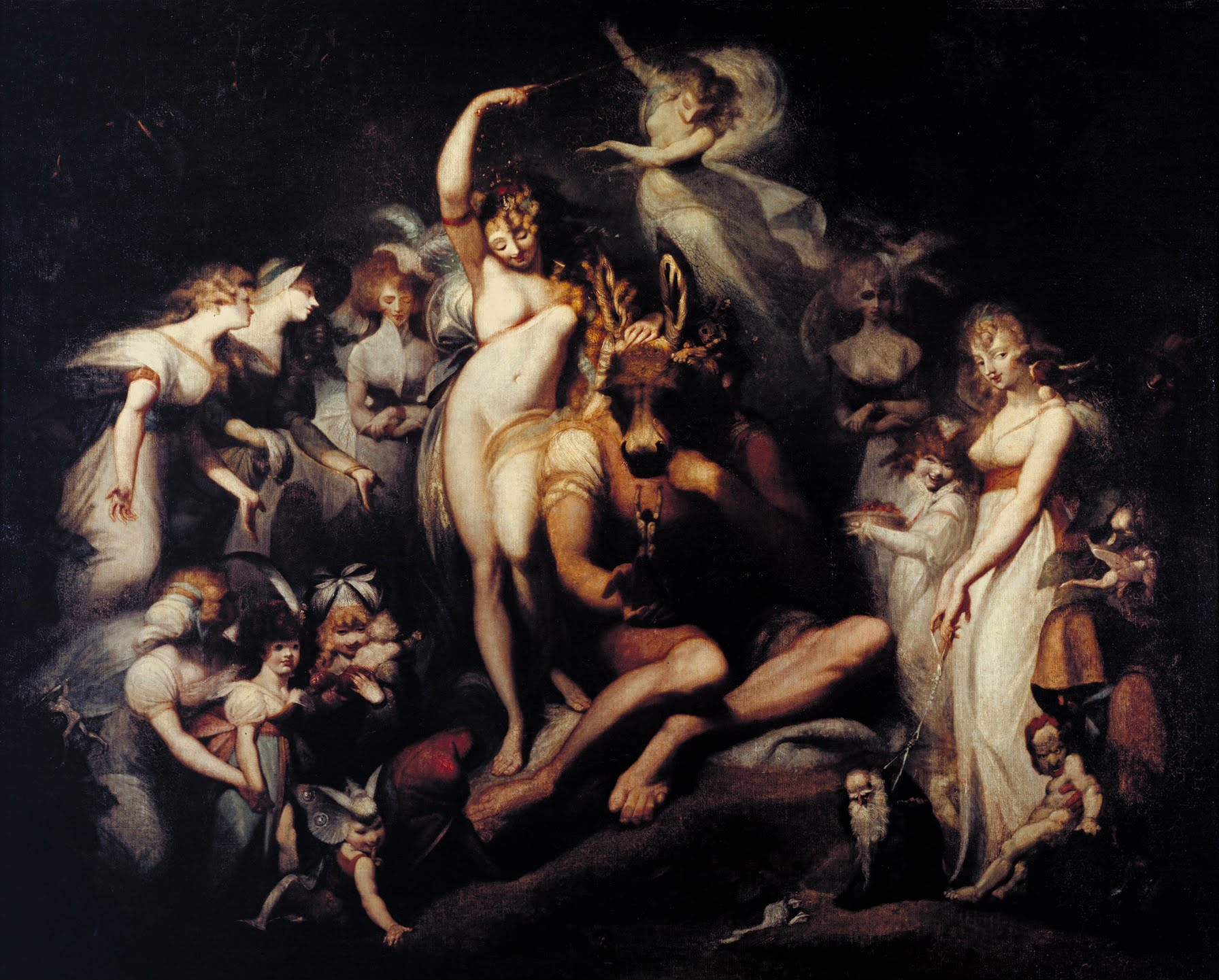
Titania and Bottom, c. 1790

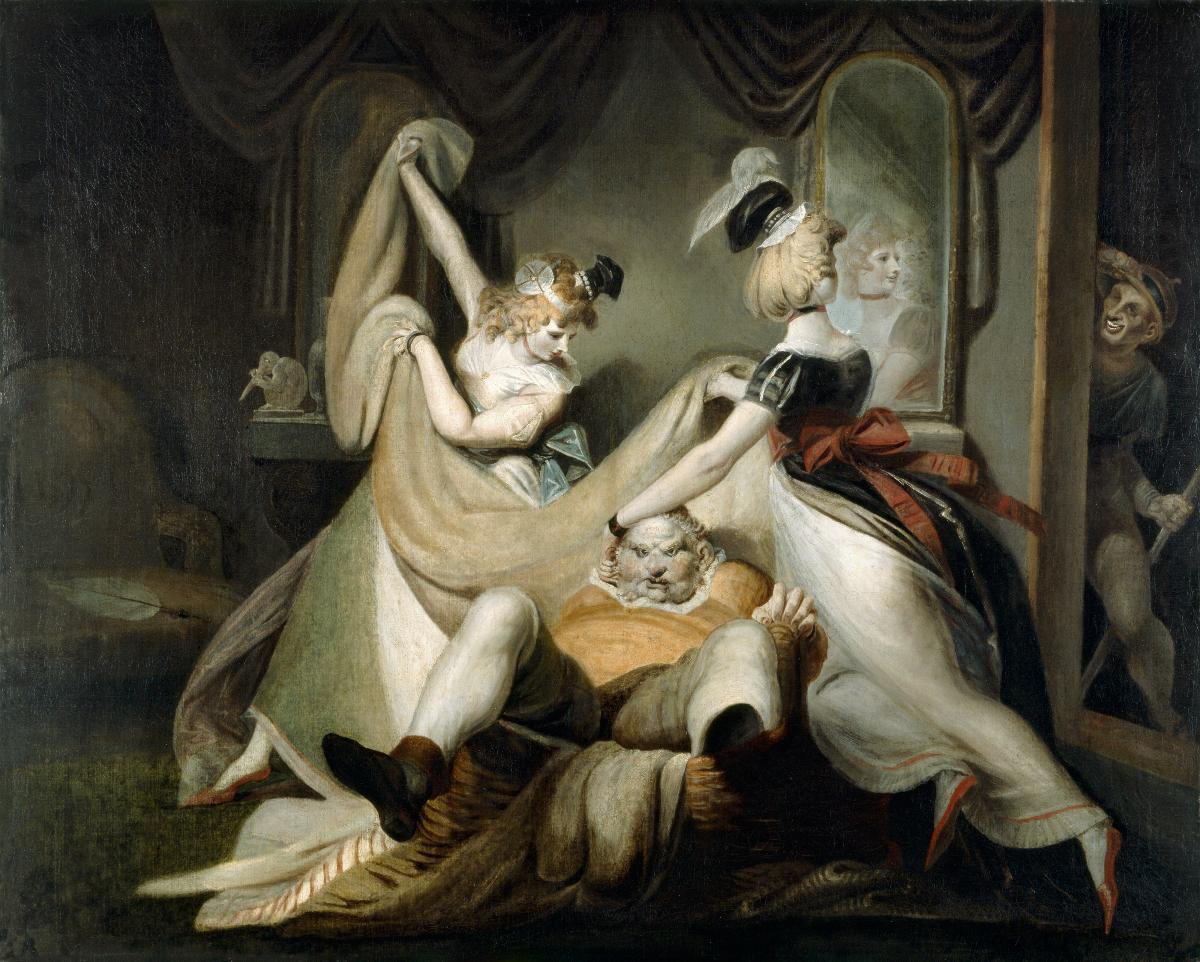
Falstaff in the Laundry Basket, 1792

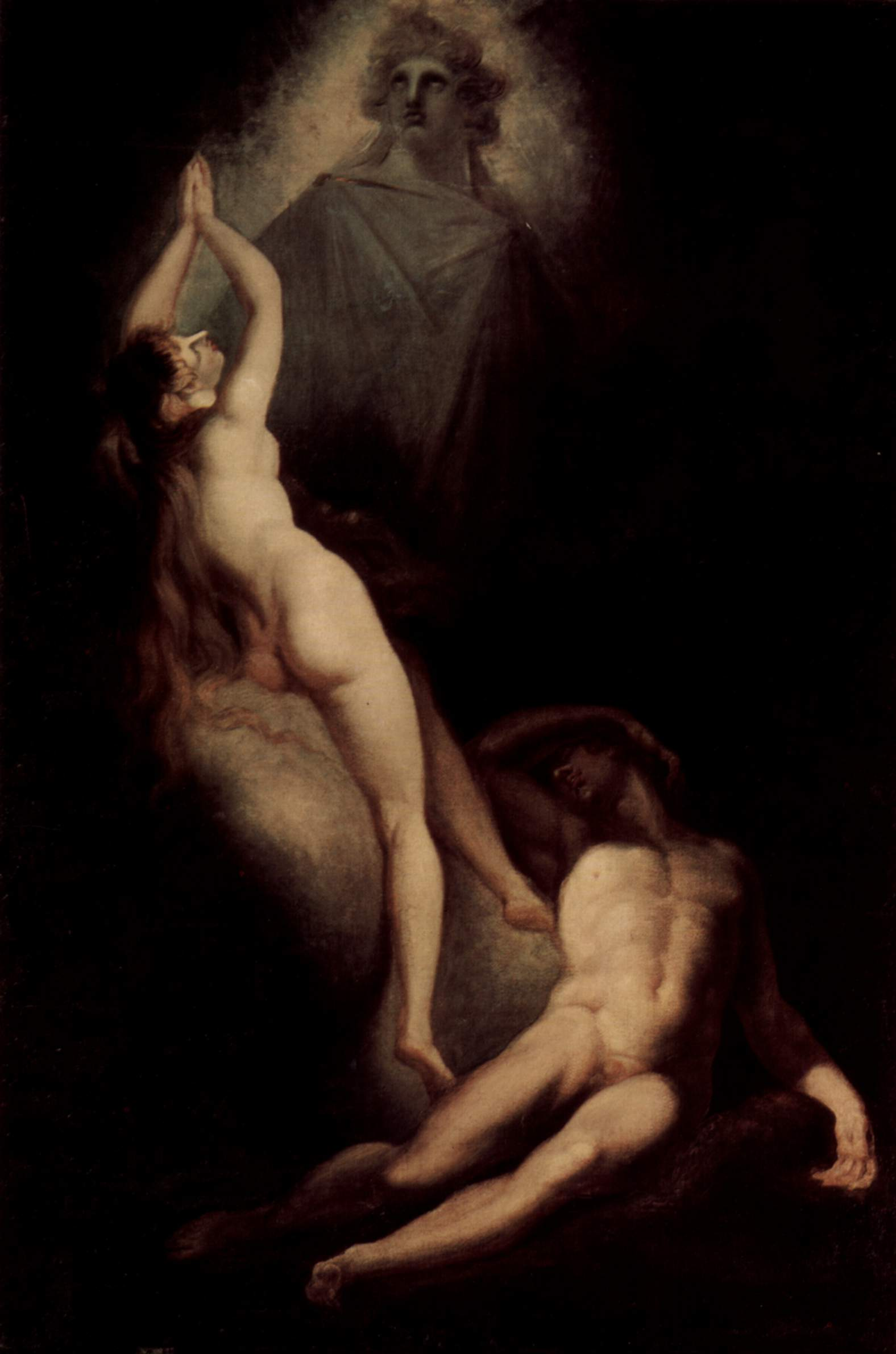
The Creation of Eve from Milton's Paradise Lost, 1793

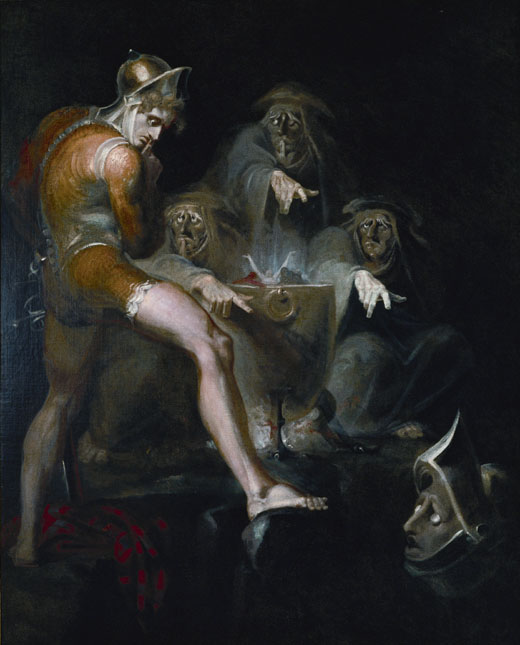
Macbeth consulting the Vision of the Armed Head, 1793

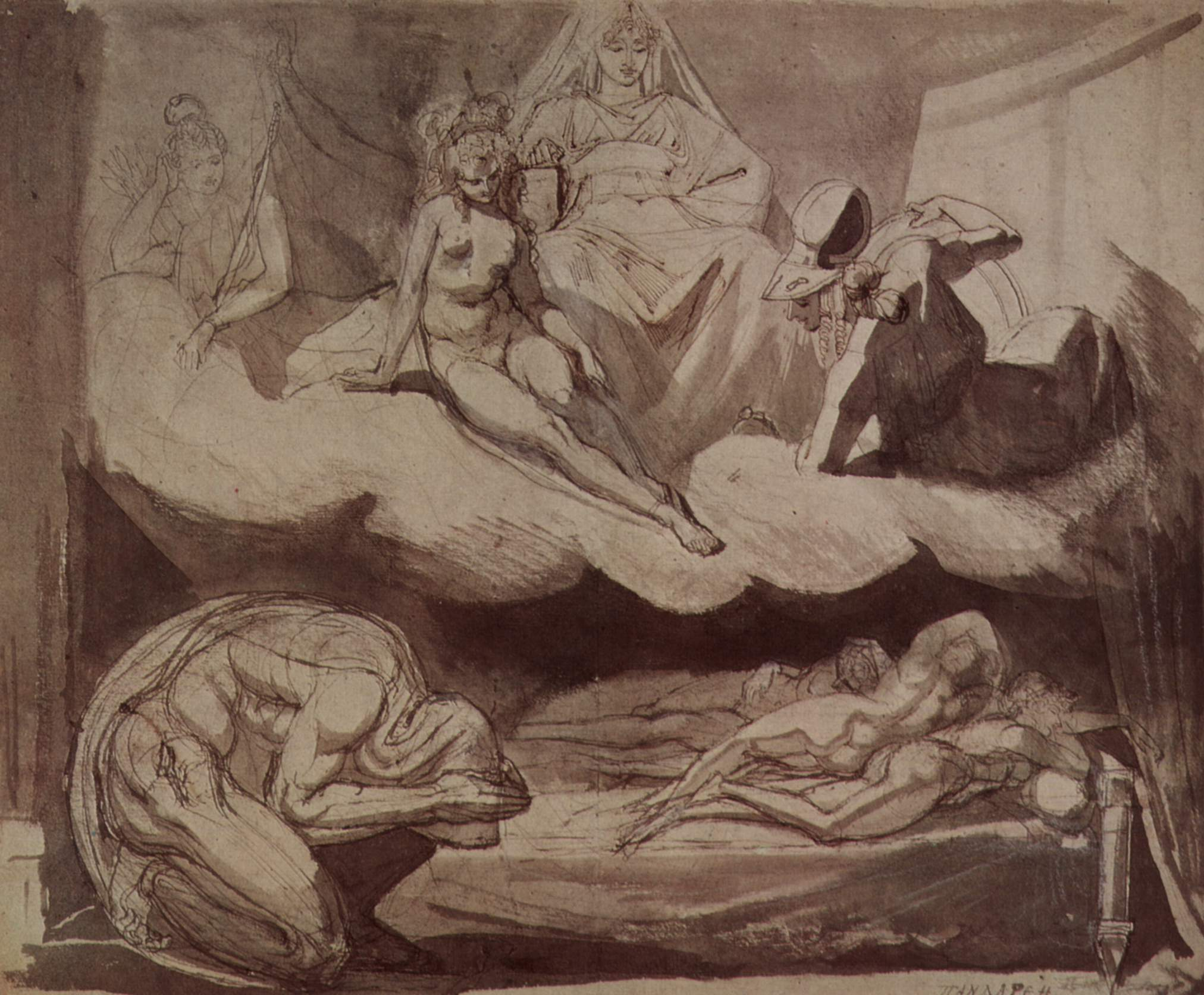
The daughters of Pandareus, c. 1795

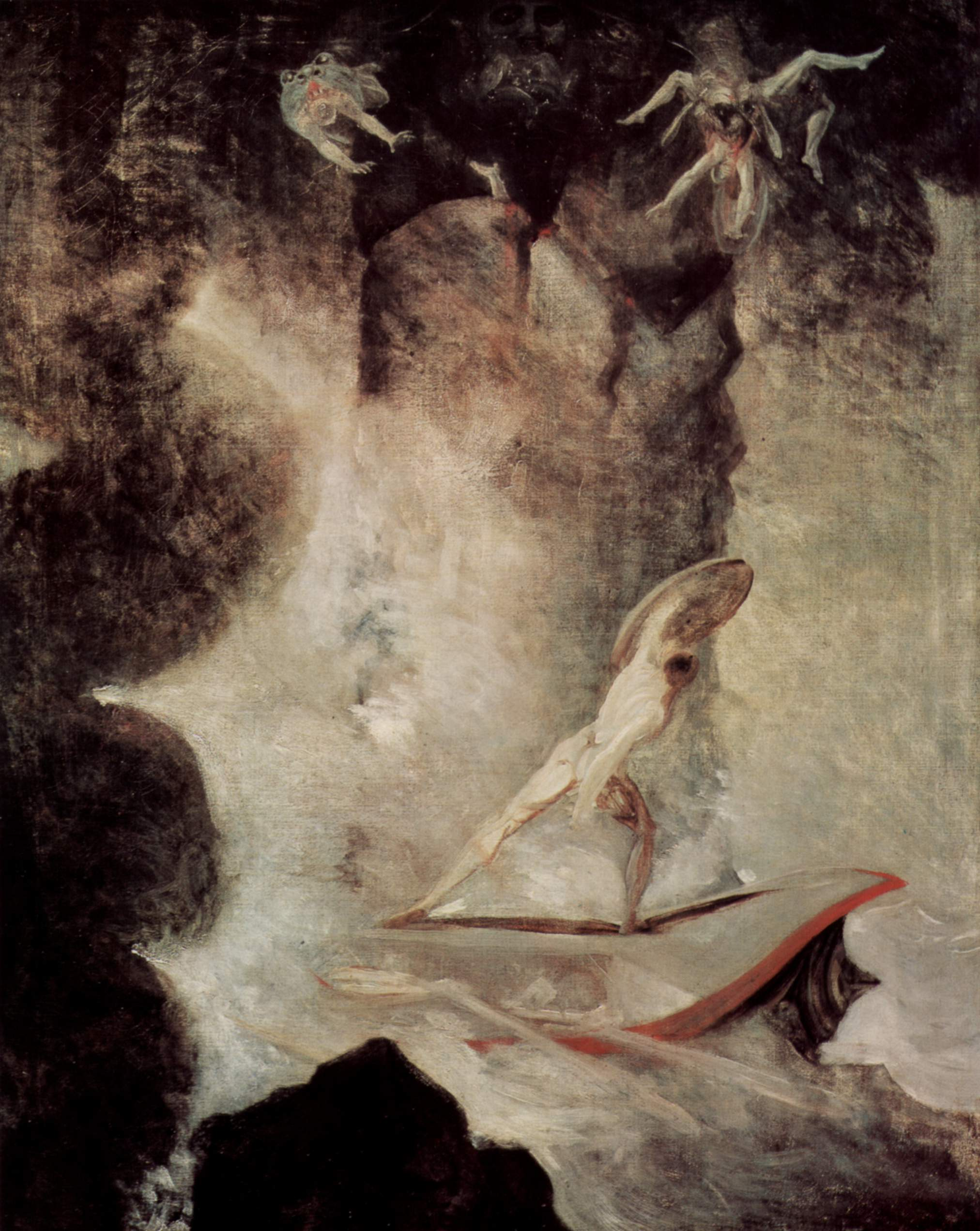
Odysseus in front of Scylla and Charybdis, 1794–1796

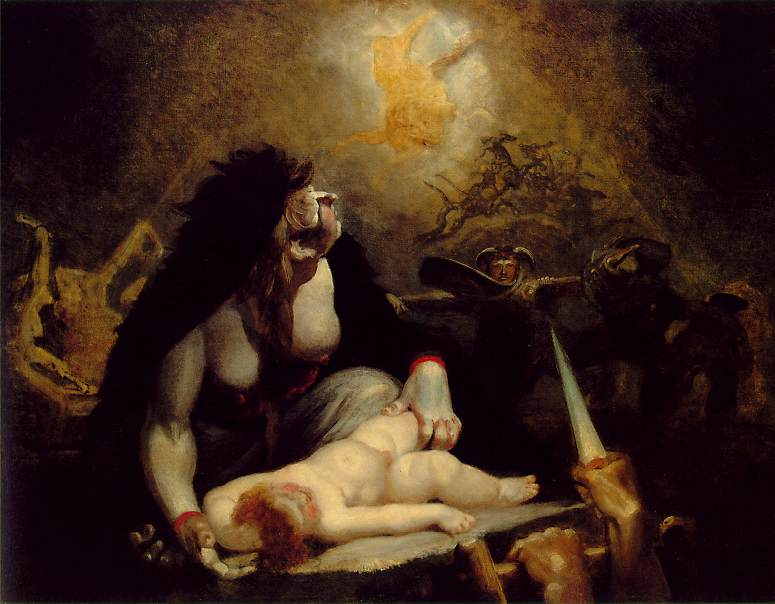
The Night-Hag visiting the Lapland Witches, 1796

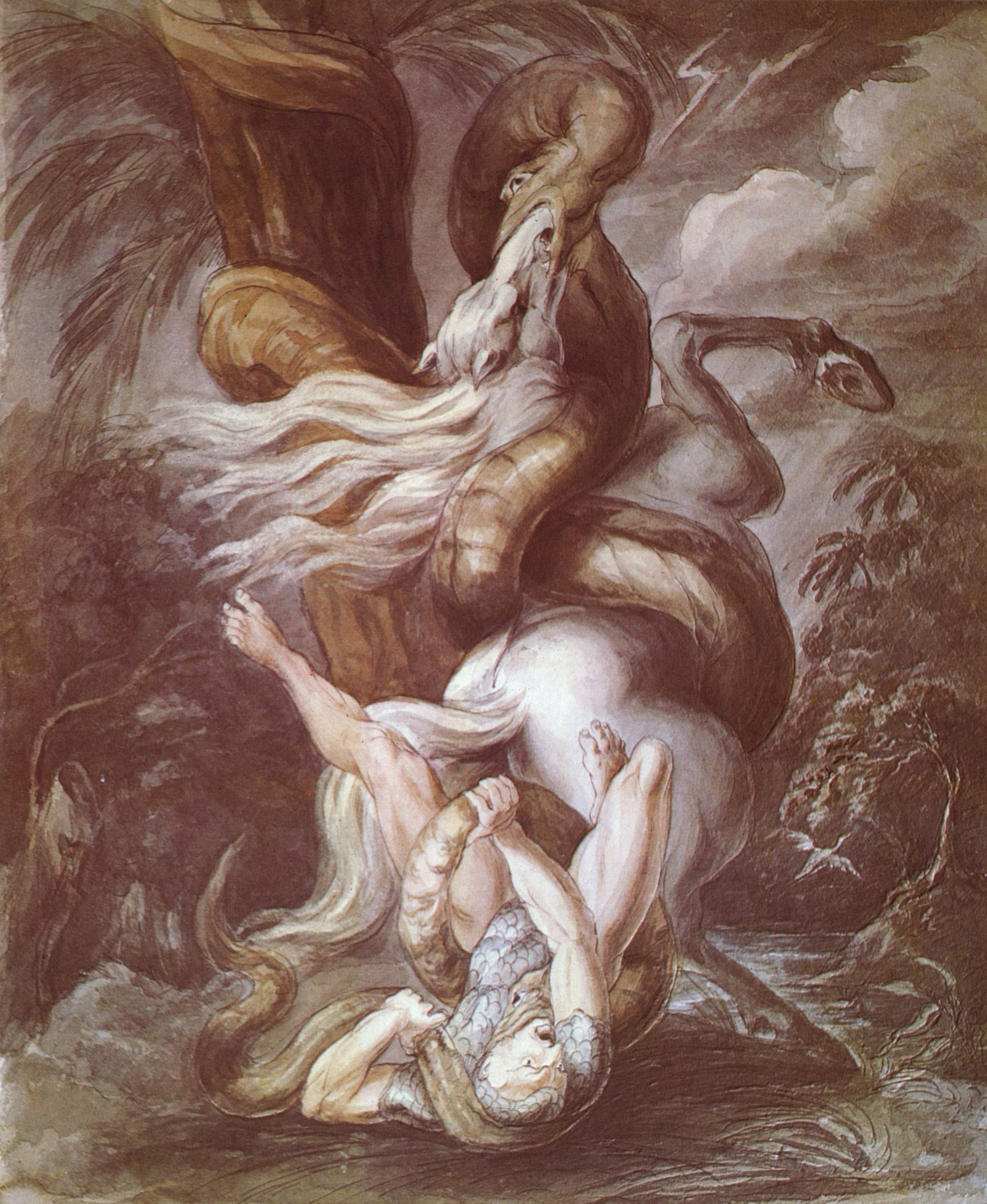
Horseman attacked by a giant snake, c. 1800

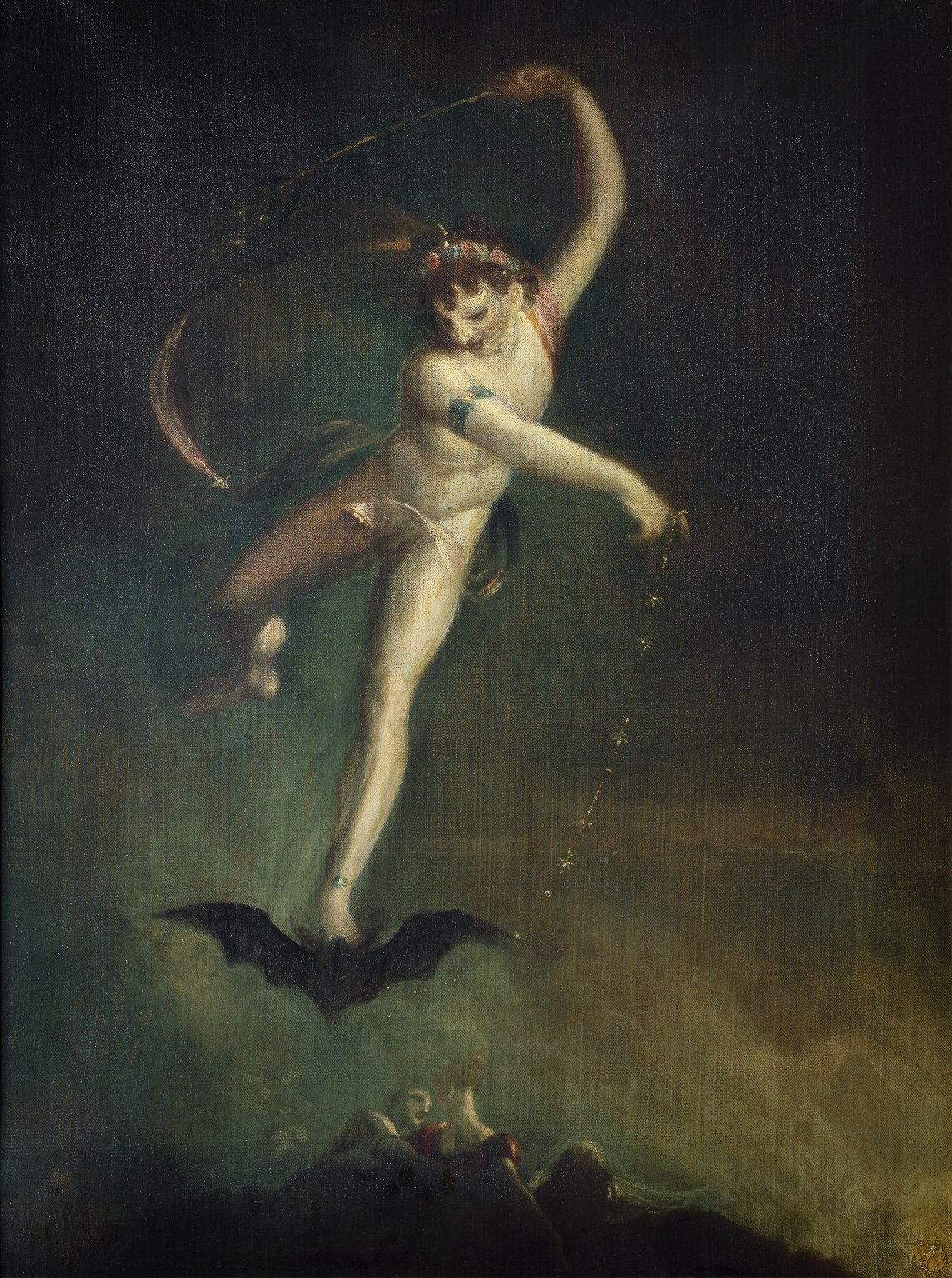
Ariel, c. 1800–1810

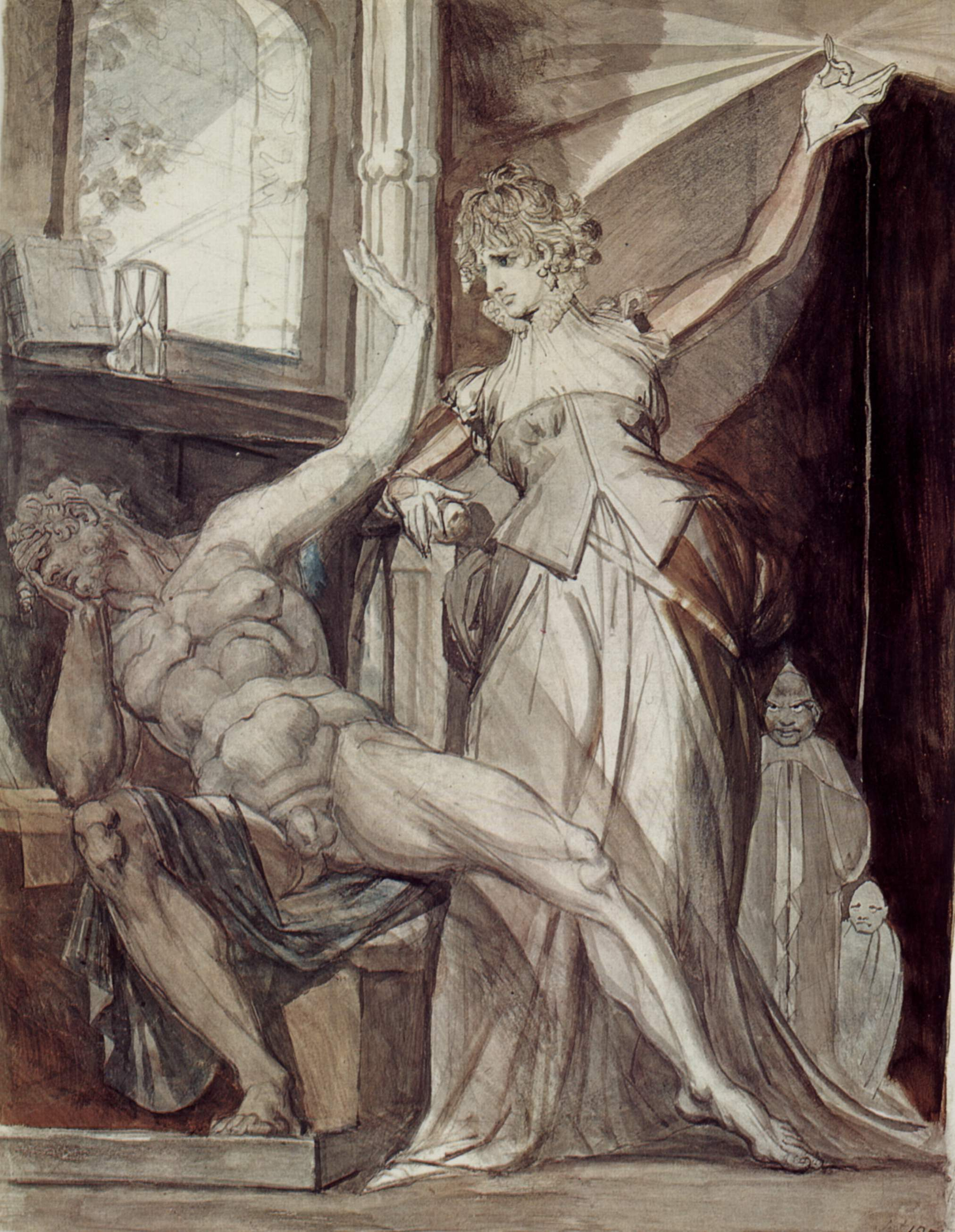
Kriemhild and Gunther, 1807

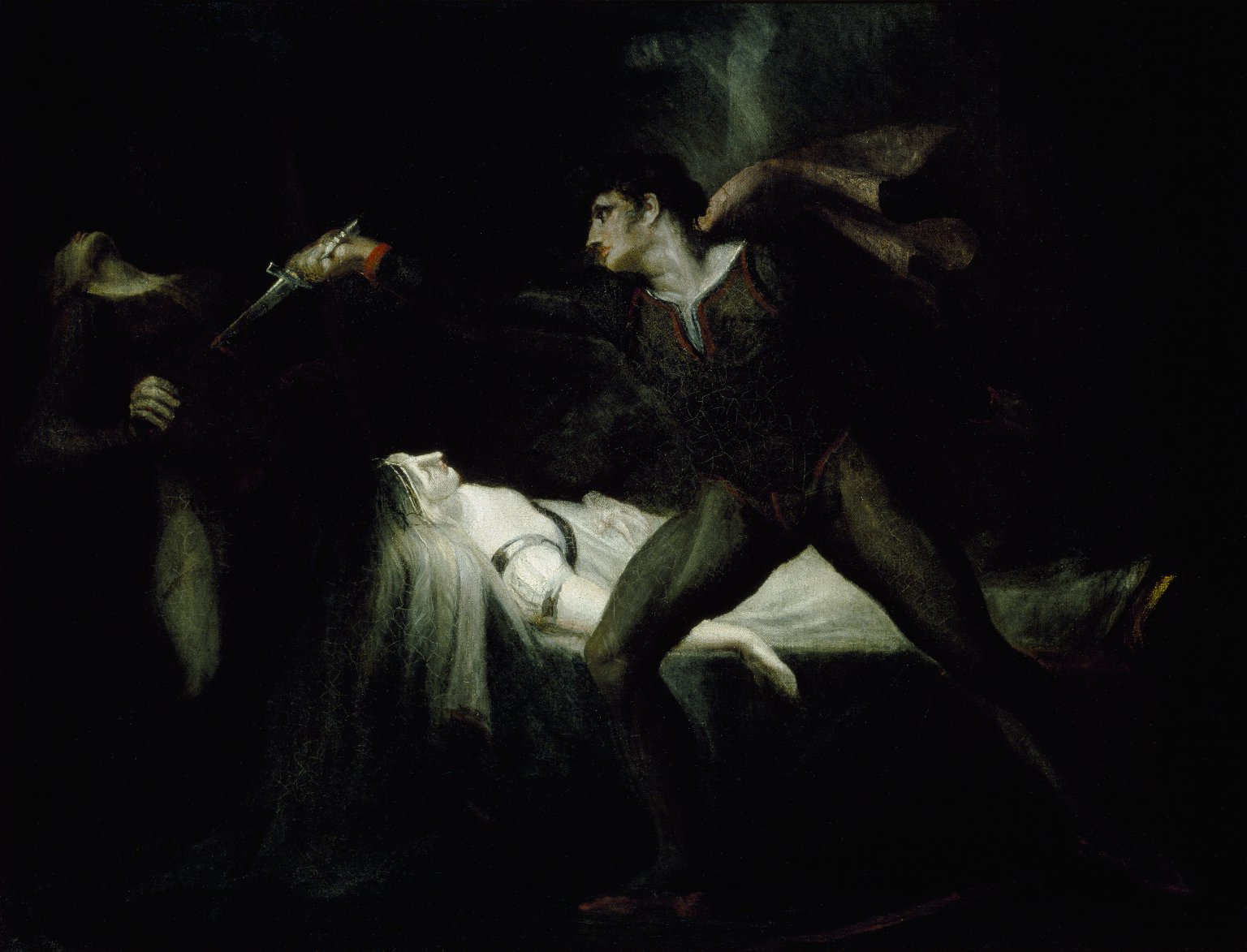
Romeo stabs Paris at the bier of Juliet, c. 1809

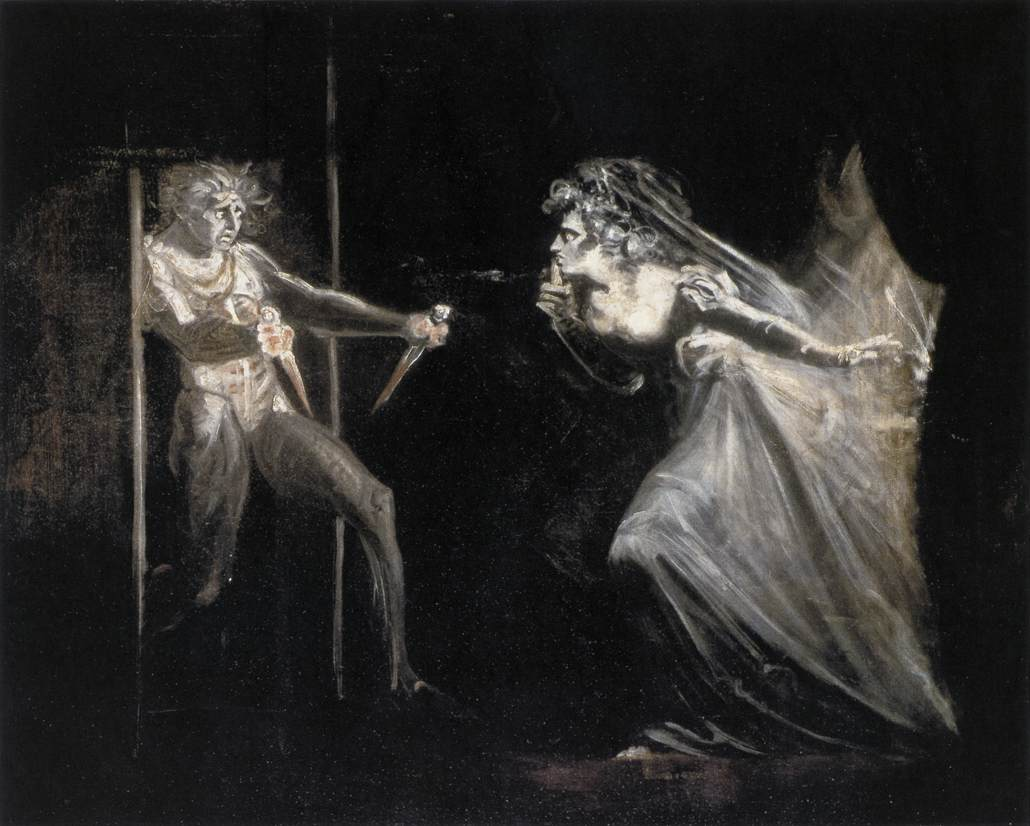
Lady Macbeth Seizing the Daggers, 1810–1812

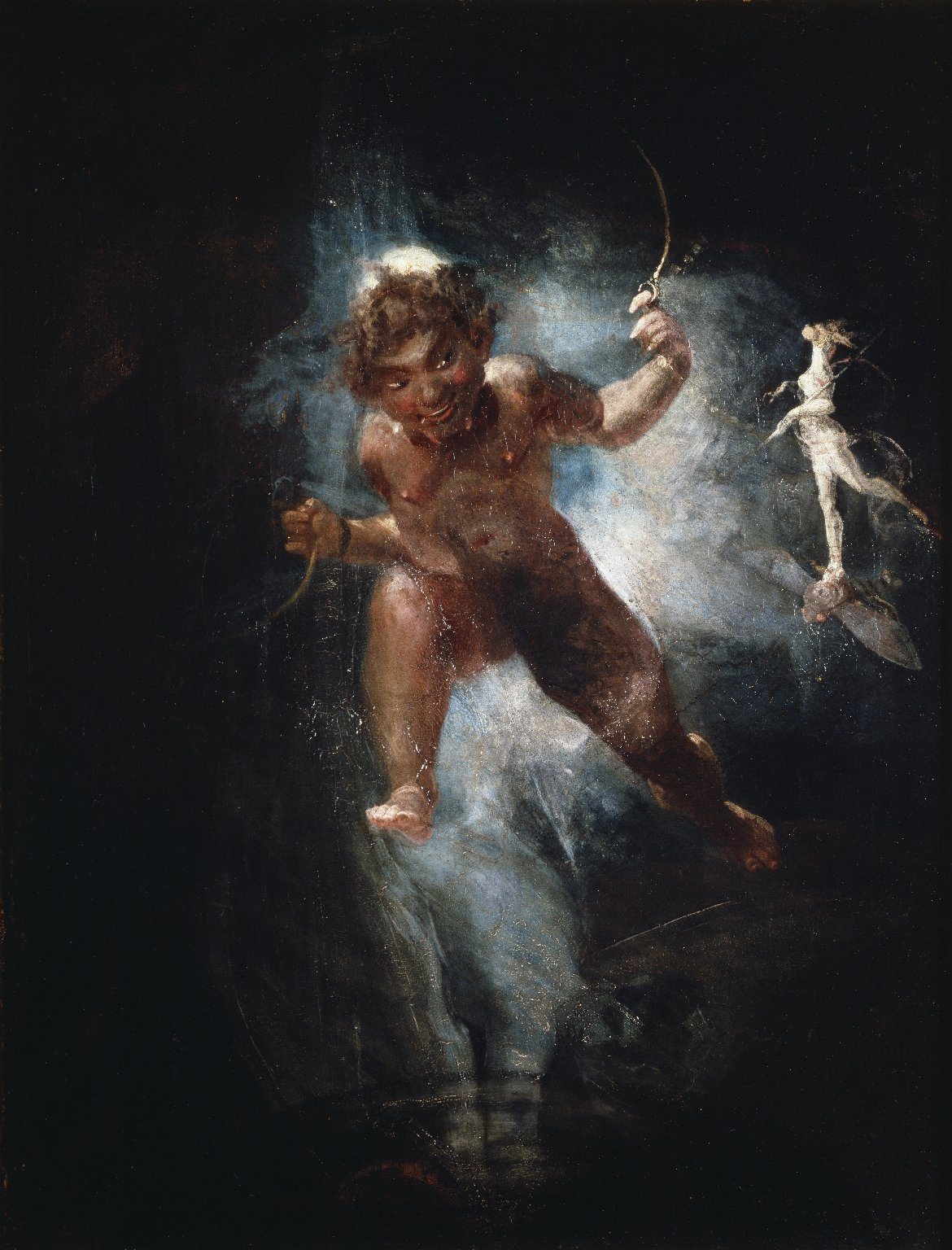
Puck, or Robin Goodfellow, c. 1810–1820

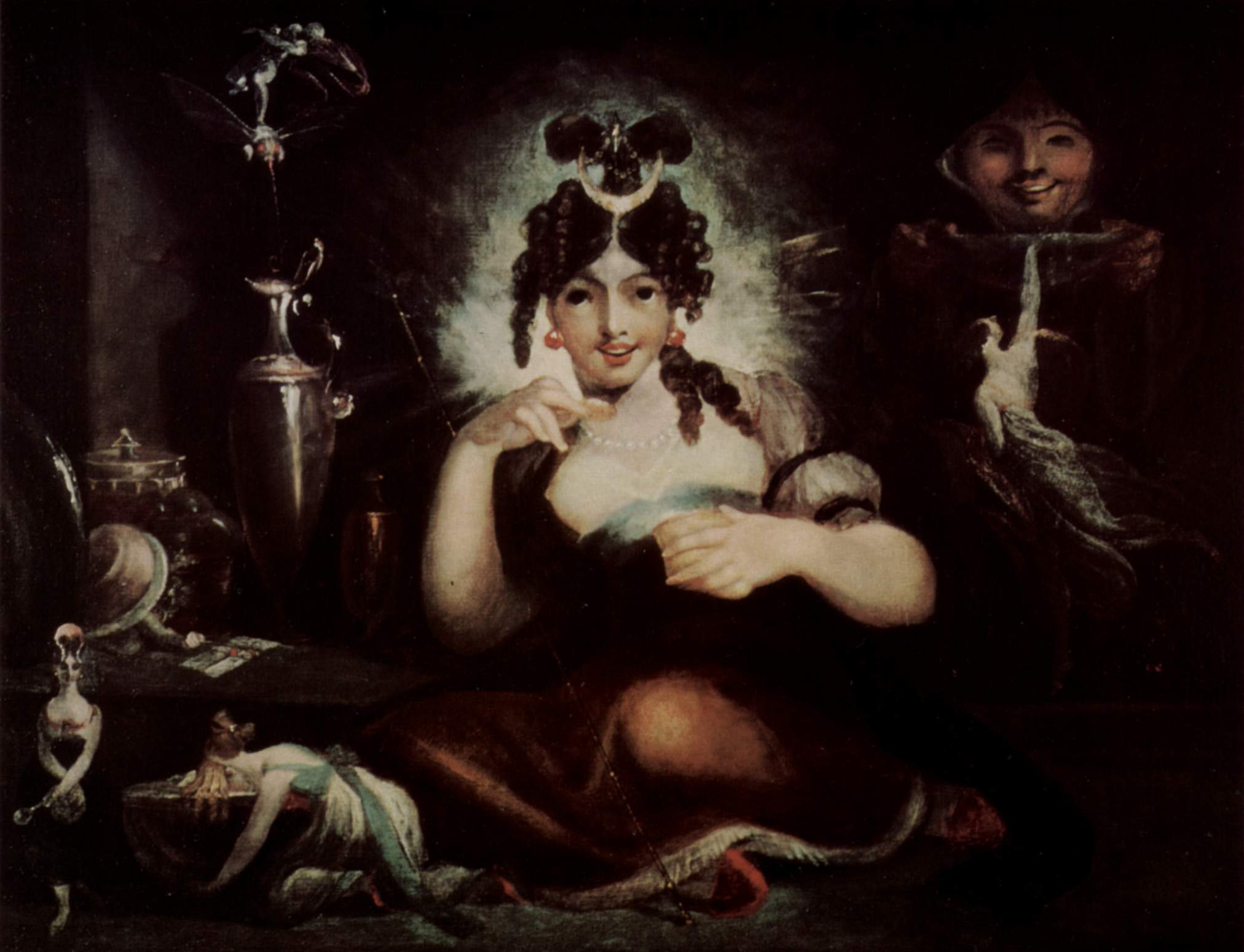
Fairy Mab, 1815–1820

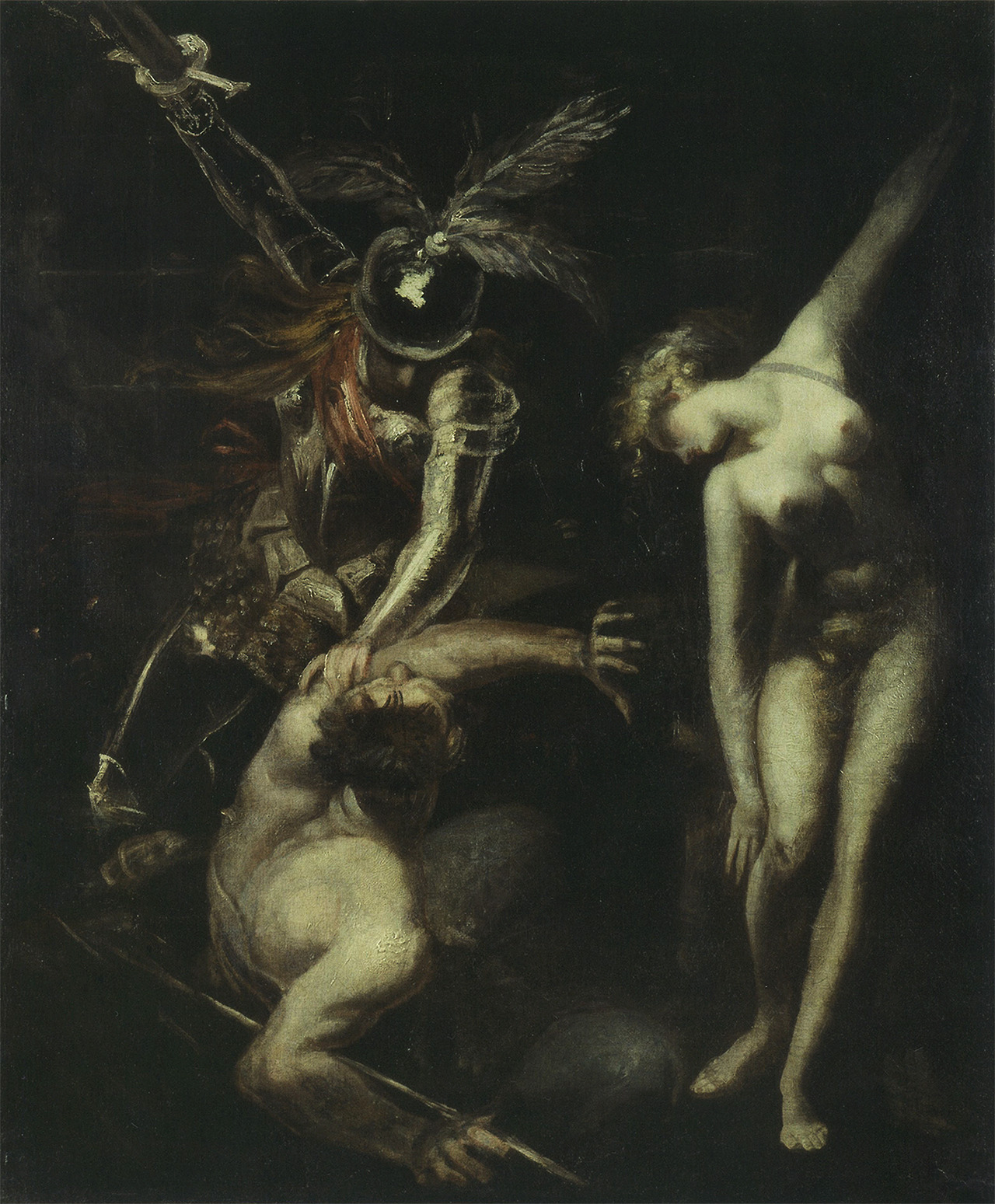
Britomart Delivering Amoretta from the Enchantment of Busirane, 1824

== Films ==
- Passion and Obsession: Henry Fuseli, 1741–1825: painter and writer by Gaudenz Meili and David H. Weinglass, Zurich 1997

== Books ==
- Creator of Nightmares: Henry Fuseli's Art and Life by Christopher Baker, Reaktion Books, 2024

== See also ==
- Füssli, Johann Caspar (1706–1782), Swiss portrait painter (father of Henry Fuseli)
- Füssli, Johann Kaspar (1743–1786), Swiss entomologist (brother of Henry Fuseli)

== References and sources ==
=== Sources ===
- "Johann Heinrich Füssli". SIKART Lexicon on art in Switzerland.
