= John Knowles (Manchester) =

19th-century English businessman

- Born: 1810; Manchester, England
- Died: 1880 (aged 69–70)
- Occupations: Businessman, theatre proprietor and manager, marble manufacturer
- Years active: 1844–1875
- Era: Victorian era
- Known for: Proprietor and manager of the Theatre Royal, Manchester
- Children: 3

John Knowles (1810–1880) was an English businessman who is well known as the proprietor of the Theatre Royal on Peter Street, Manchester from 1844 to 1875. He was also a manufacturer of marble chimneypieces.

== Biography ==
John Knowles was born in Chapel Street, London Road, Manchester. He was the son of a successful businessman, whose many business interests included, as well as that of a coal merchant, the manufacturing of "British and Italian marble chimney-pieces by machinery" and the proprietorship of the Peacock Office at 105 Market Street, from which the famous "Peveril of the Peak" coach made its journey from Manchester to London. His greatest business venture was that of the Theatre Royal, in which he was the proprietor for more thirty years. In later life, Knowles lived at Trafford Bank House, Old Trafford. He was married to Susan and had three children. Knowles died in February 1880, aged sixty-nine years old.

== Theatre Royal ==
John Knowles was presented a plate by his friends who were full of praise for him in 1844. He received this "in acknowledgement of his energetic and successful efforts to revive national drama in Manchester".

Knowles's theatrical career began at the time when the theatre in Manchester was at its lowest ebb. Knowles took over the management of the second Theatre Royal in Fountain Street; he set up a strong stock company and proved himself a very capable, though somewhat authoritarian, theatre manager. However, due to a fire in 1844, it was destroyed. The proprietors of the theatre in Fountain Street refused to rebuild it. At a public dinner, Knowles stated that if they could get no one else to build a theatre then he would do it himself. As a result, Knowles bought the patent rights and set about finding a site for the new theatre. Knowles had always been an admirer of theatrical performances and he was anxious to see their renovation in this, his native town. He desired to see the revival of the legitimate drama, and the plays represented in a manner duly worthy of them.

Knowles found a new site for his theatre on Peter Street. He demolished the Wellington Inn and Brogden's Horse Bazaar. Knowles employed Francis Chester and John Gould Irwin as the architects for his new theatre. In preparation for the building of the new Theatre Royal, Knowles and Chester went to London and visited most of the metropolitan theatres, noting their areas, internal forms, acoustic capabilities, etc. With a cost of £23,000, the new Theatre Royal opened to an audience of 2,500. Precautionary measures against fire were taken by placing a tank on the roof capable of holding 20,000 gallons of water, which was connected by pipes to the stage and the green room. Its programme that night included Weber's Oberon overture, Douglas Jerrold's "Time works wonders" and an elaborate ballet spectacle "The Court Ball in 1740". Knowles's schedule of productions was intensive – in one season there were 157 performances at which two and sometimes three plays were performed. The popularity of the theatre grew. Charles Dickens, John Leech and George Cruikshank were amongst notable people who appeared at the theatre. The theatre was dedicated to Shakespeare and Knowles installed a Carrara marble statue of the playwright above the entrance. It was Manchester's finest outdoor statue. In 1875, after years of success, Knowles severed his connections with the theatre, disposing of it to a limited company for £50,000.

=== Pantomime ===
John Knowles's speciality was pantomime, and he made pantomime at Christmas a regular occasion. These pantomimes were highly rehearsed and acclaimed for their charm. In 1866, Knowles was questioned by the Parliamentary select committee regarding the types of dramatic genres that attracted audiences at provincial theatres. He was asked whether 'the higher class of drama answers' or whether 'successful speculation is confined to pantomime, burlesque, and kindred pieces?' Knowles answered that for most provincial theatres 'Pantomime is the attraction throughout the kingdom; it is the sheet-anchor of the drama at the present moment'.

=== Other work ===
Knowles was a clever financier; he gave loans to other companies, securing through them favourable terms for his company, and he was also lessee for His Majesty's Theatre in London's Haymarket.

Knowles also supported charities. In the spring of 1852, John Knowles gave use of the theatre and paid all the expenses of six successive evening entertainments in aid of thirteen local charities; by which those charities benefitted to the extent of £1,000. After the successful run of this, Knowles and the Committee stated that they would carry out a similar festival, but on a larger scale.

== Marble Works ==
The Theatre Royal was only one of John Knowles's business interest. He was also a manufacturer of marble chimney pieces, tombs and monuments. There were many advertisements in The Manchester Guardian; one reads, 'Italian marble chimney pieces, and c. John Knowles respectfully solicits an inspection of his EXTENSIVE STOCK OF CHIMNEY PIECES, in every description...'

== Legacy ==
Knowles was felt by many to be arrogant and overbearing in business, but others admired his quick understanding and thoroughness, all agreeing on his wit and hospitality in his private life. He was one of the most successful managers of the Theatre Royal, resurrecting it from its ashes and reviving the theatrical culture of Manchester.
