= John Knowles (English author) =

English biographer and naval author

John Knowles (1781 – 21 July 1841) was the English biographer of Henry Fuseli and an author of works on naval architecture.

== Life ==
Knowles, born in 1781, became a clerk in the surveyor's department of the navy office early in life. He attained the chief clerkship there about 1806, and held this post until 1832. He published two or three works on naval matters, including The Elements and Practice of Naval Architecture (1822). For his scientific researches he was elected a fellow of the Royal Society. Knowles is best known, however, from his long, intimate friendship with Henry Fuseli the painter, and with the circle to which Fuseli belonged. He was the executor of Fuseli's will, his biographer, and a devoted admirer of his art.

Knowles died, unmarried, at Ashburton, Devonshire, on 21 July 1841, aged 60. He was one of the original members of the Athenæum Club, and his portrait, drawn by Charles Landseer, is No. 25 of the series of lithographs published as Athenæum Portraits by Thomas McLean. He was a corresponding member of the Philosophical Society of Rotterdam.

== Works ==
In 1830 he published an edition of Fuseli's Lectures on Painting, and in 1831, in 3 vols. the life of Fuseli, written as a labour of love, to which was added an edition of the painter's writings on art.
