= Temple at Uppsala =

Nordic pagan temple

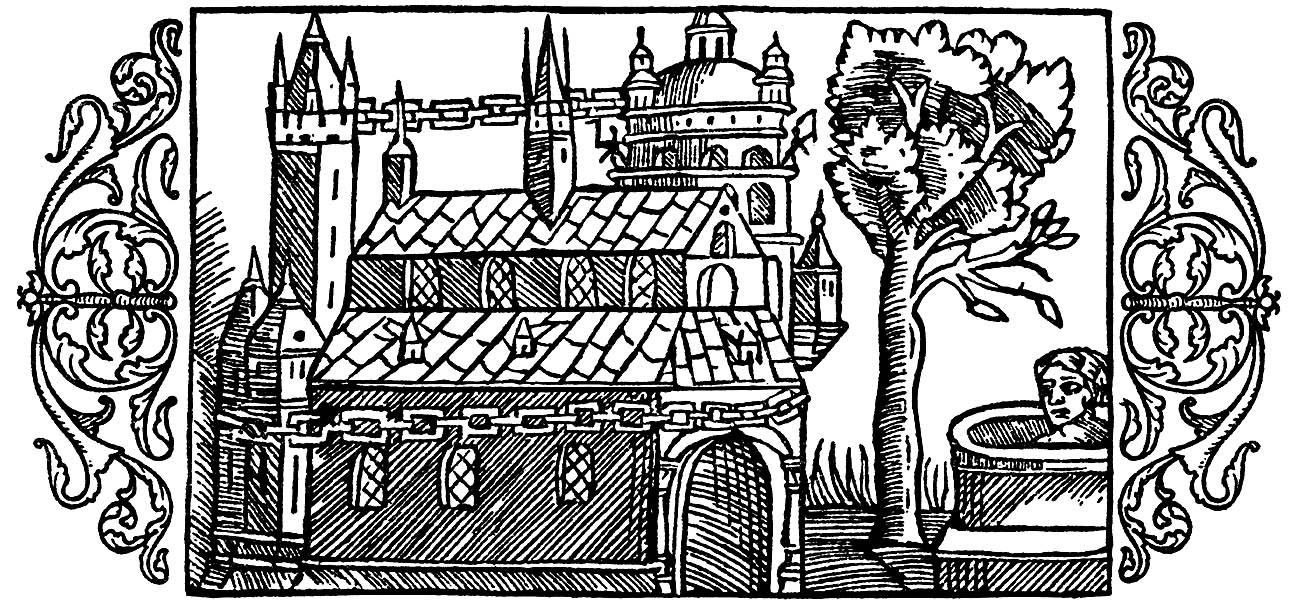
A woodcut depicting the Temple at Uppsala as described by Adam of Bremen, including the golden chain around the temple, the well and the tree, from Olaus Magnus' Historia de Gentibus Septentrionalibus (1555).

The Temple at Uppsala was long held to be a religious centre in the Norse religion once located at what became Gamla Uppsala (Swedish "Old Uppsala"), Sweden attested in Adam of Bremen's 11th-century work Gesta Hammaburgensis ecclesiae pontificum and in Heimskringla, written by Snorri Sturluson in the 13th century. Uppsala has for long been exposed to fanciful theories about the implications of these descriptions of the temple and of the findings of archaeological excavations in the area, including findings of extensive wooden structures and log lines from the 5th century which allegedly played a supporting role to activities at the site, including ritual sacrifice. According to sources from the later Middle Ages the temple was destroyed by King Inge the Elder in the 1080s, but there are no contemporary sources to support that.

== Adam of Bremen ==
=== Description ===
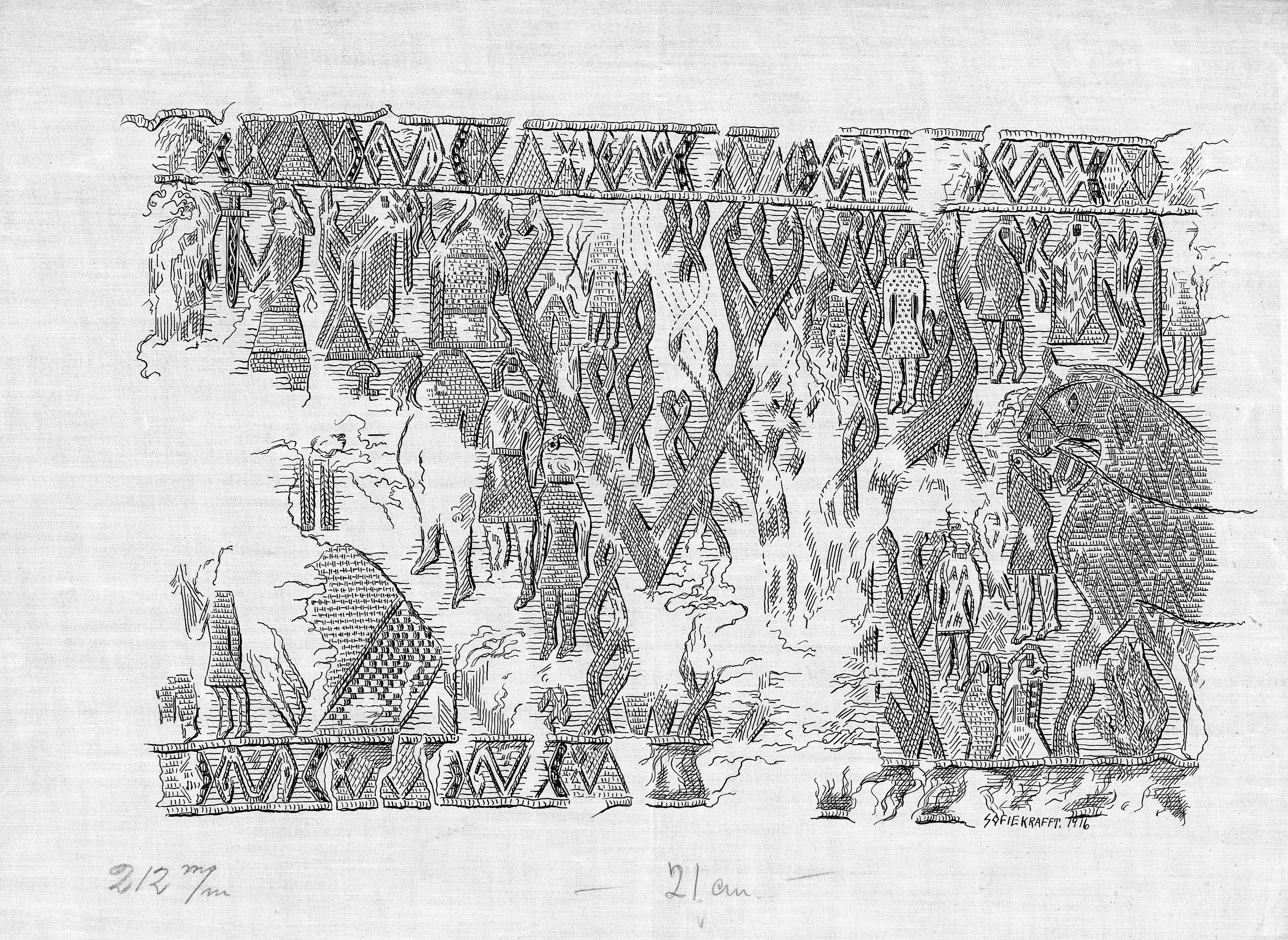
Some scholars have claimed to see sacrificed men hanging from the branches of a tree, in the Oseberg tapestry fragments.

In Gesta Hammaburgensis ecclesiae pontificum, Adam of Bremen provides a description of the temple. Adam records that a "very famous temple called Ubsola" exists in a town close to Sigtuna. Adam details that the temple is "made out of gold" and that the people there worship statues of three specific gods that sit on a triple throne. Thor, whom Adam refers to as "the mightiest," sits in the central throne, while Wodan (Odin) and Fricco (Freyr) are seated on the thrones to the sides of him. Adam provides information about the characteristics of the three gods, including that Fricco is depicted with an immense erect penis, Wodan in armour ("as our people depict Mars," Adam notes) and that Thor has a mace, a detail which Adam compares to that of the Roman god Jupiter. Adam adds that, in addition, "they also worship gods who were once men, whom they reckon to be immortal because of their heroic acts [...].". Adam says that the three gods have a priest appointed to them each who offer up sacrifices to the deities from the people. If famine or plague occurs, a sacrifice is made to Thor; if there is war, a sacrifice is made to Wodan; if a marriage is to be held, a sacrifice is made to Fricco. Adam continues that "every nine years there is a communal festival of every province in Sweden held in Ubsola; and those already converted to Christianity have to buy themselves off from the ceremonies."

Adam details sacrificial practices held at the temple; Adam describes that nine males of "every living creature" are offered up for sacrifice, and tradition dictates that their blood placates the gods. The corpses of the nine males are hung within the grove beside the temple. Adam says that the grove is considered extremely sacred to the heathens, so much so that each singular tree "is considered to be divine," due to the death of those sacrificed or their rotting corpses hanging there, and that dogs and horses hang within the grove among the corpses of men. Adam reveals that "A Christian seventy-two years old" informed him that he had seen cadavers of differing species hanging within the grove. Adam expresses disgust at the songs they sing during these sacrificial rites, quipping that the songs are "so many and disgusting that it is best to pass over them in silence."

Adam describes that near the temple stands a massive tree with far-spreading branches, which is evergreen both in summer and winter. At the tree is also a spring where sacrifices are held. According to Adam, a custom exists where a man, alive, is thrown into the spring, and if he fails to return to the surface, "the wish of the people will be fulfilled."

Adam writes that a golden chain surrounds the temple that hangs from the gables of the building. The chain is very visible to those approaching the temple from a distance due to the landscape where the temple was built; it is surrounded by hills, "like an amphitheatre." The feasts and sacrifices continue for a total of nine days, and during the course of each day a man is sacrificed along with two animals. Therefore, in a total of nine days twenty-seven sacrifices occur, and, Adam notes, these sacrifices occur "about the time of the spring equinox."

=== Views ===
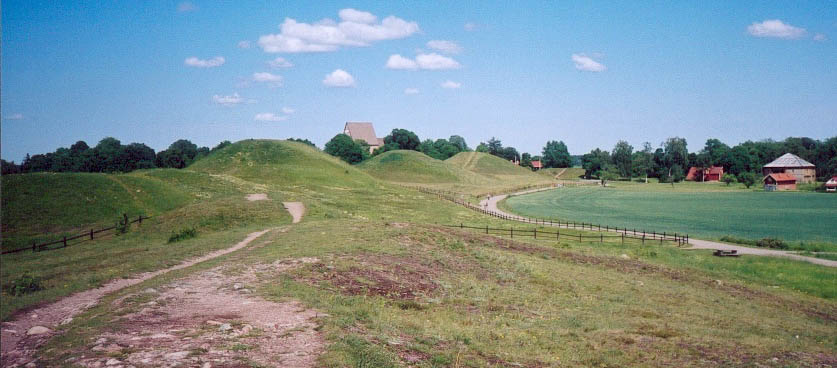
Gamla Uppsala, the centre of worship in Sweden until the temple was destroyed in the late 11th century.

Rudolf Simek says that, regarding Adam of Bremen's account of the temple, "Adam's sources for this information are of extremely varying reliability, but the existence of a temple at Uppsala is undisputed." The question is if this temple was pagan or Christian. Simek says that details of Adam's accounts have been cited as potentially influenced by the description of Solomon's Temple in the Old Testament. Simek notes, at the same time, similar chains as described by Adam appear on some European churches dating from the 8th to 9th centuries, although the description of the temple chain having been made of gold may be an exaggeration. Simek says that the numerous attempts at reconstructing the temple based on the postholes may overestimate the size of the temple, and notes that "more recent" research indicates that the site of the 11th-century temple probably adjoined the choir of the church standing there today, while the postholes discovered by Lindqvist may instead point to an earlier, burnt-down temple at the same site.

Building on previous critical discussions about Adam of Bremen's description of the temple by the archaeologists Harald Wideen and Olaf Olsen, Henrik Janson in his fundamental study on the European background of Adam's work, came to the conclusion that Adam used the case of Uppsala to display some of the more prominent lines of conflict at the outbreak of the investiture controversy. These lines of conflict reached deep into Scandinavia. Papacy and Empire were competing about the control of the Northern parts of Europe, and the Empire, through the Archbishopric of Hamburg-Bremen, claimed subjugation of the Scandinavian kingdoms under the Imperial church. These rights were however challenged by some political actors in the North, and a particularly strong resistance came from the kingdom of the Swedes where another Church, called Gallicana ecclesia by Pope Gregory VII, had the support of the Papacy. This Church can be connected to the Mälar-region and indeed Uppsala. It is not totally clear where the representatives of this "Gallican Church" came from, but one part of these influences can certainly be recognized in later Swedish saint lives remembering bishops from England, connected to the Cluniac reform movement, active in the Mälar-region in the 11th century - obviously in opposition to the Imperial Church of Hamburg-Bremen for which Adam of Bremen was trying to build up divine historical legitimacy. An important part of the picture is the fact that in these years it became feasible to accuse opponents of paganism even if it was obvious that they were perfectly good Christians. The key concepts here were faith, fides, meaning faithfulness, and obedience, obedientia, as was explicitly stated by Gregory VII in precisely these years: "anyone falls into the sin of heathenism [paganitas] who, while claiming that he is a Christian, disdains to obey the apostolic see". Previously these measures had mainly been directed against socially inferior groups – e.g. the Saxons against the Slavs and for that matter Scandinavians – but now this theological weapon was fired against the highest representatives of the Imperial Church. The first one to be hit was Archbishop Liemar of Hamburg Bremen, in whose service and defense Adam of Bremen was writing his work. Pointing to the lack of sources that could confirm Adam's description about a pagan temple in Uppsala, and bringing forth other sources, such as the over one thousand Christian rune stones in the area, showing that Christianity was well established there when Adam was writing, Janson concluded that the Uppsala Temple was nothing but a Christian church resisting The Sacred Roman Empire, with support from the Papacy and enemies of Henry IV that gathered around Gregory VII at the very outbreak of the Investiture contest.

Orchard (1997) states that "it is unclear to what extent Adam's description has a basis in historical fact rather than lurid fiction" yet that Adam's account contains "a good deal of useful information (as well as considerable speculation)." Orchard points out that Adam's description of the temple has often been questioned "on several levels" and that Thietmar of Merseburg produced a considerably less detailed but similar account of sacrifices held in Lejre, Denmark earlier in the 11th century. Thietmar's account, however, concerns the religious situation in Denmark in the early 10th century, almost a century before he was writing, and he actually states that these pagan rites were extinguished in the 930s. Thus, there are good reasons to doubt that he could "give a fair representation of pre-Christian rituals" in Scandinavia.

== Heimskringla ==
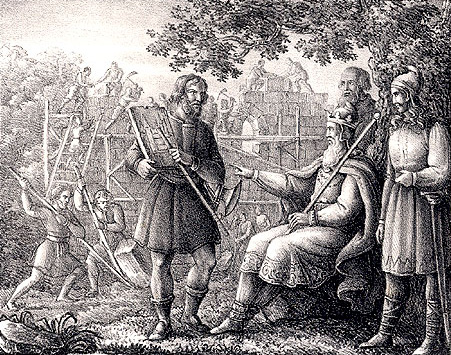
Yngvi-Freyr constructs the Temple at Uppsala (1830) by Hugo Hamilton

In the Ynglinga saga compiled in Heimskringla, Snorri presents a euhemerized origin of the Norse gods and rulers descending from them. In chapter 5, Snorri asserts that the æsir settled in what later became Sweden and built various temples. Snorri writes that "Odin took up his residence at the Maelare lake, at the place now called Old Sigtun. There he erected a large farm shrine (hof), where there were offerings (blót) according to the customs of the Asaland people. He appropriated to himself the whole of that district, and called it Sigtun. To the shrine spirits (hofgoðunum) he gave also dwelling places. Njörðr dwelt in Nóatún, Frey in Upsal, Heimdal in the Himinbergs, Thor in Thrudvang, and Balder in Breidablik; to all of them he gave good estates."

In chapter 10, after Njörðr has died, his son Freyr comes to power and "he was called the king of Swedes and received tribute from them." Freyr's subjects loved him greatly, and he was "blessed by good seasons like his father." According to the saga, Freyr "erected a great shrine at Uppsala and made his chief residence there, directing it to all tribute due to him, both lands and chattels. This was the origin of the Uppsala crown goods, which have been kept up ever since."

== Archaeological record ==
In 1926, Sune Lindqvist conducted archaeological investigations in Gamla Uppsala and discovered postholes beneath the church in Gamla Uppsala. These postholes may be lined up with the result of concentric rectangles, and subsequently various attempts at reconstructions of the temple have been attempted based on this discovery.

Price and Alkarp (2005) have been among those who dispute the 1926 interpretation:

Though still maintained today in school textbooks and elsewhere, this conclusion is clearly erroneous as the postholes can be shown stratigraphically to belong to several different phases of construction.

Using ground penetrating radar and other geophysical methods, Price and Alkarp found the remains of what they interpreted as a wooden construction located directly under the northern transept of the medieval cathedral, and two other buildings, one of them a Bronze Age building, and the other possibly a Viking Age feasting hall. Orchard (1997) says that archaeological digs in the area "have failed to reveal anything on the scale proposed for the temple" yet that three burial mounds at the location reveal the importance of the site.

In 2013, the remains of two lines of large wooden poles were discovered. One line is approximately a kilometer long consisting of 144 poles and the other half a kilometer with each pole being separated by 5–6 meters. The line probably continues but was not excavated due to lack of funds. The shorter line is perpendicular to the first, located a kilometer to the south and broken into a corner which indicates that if the lines mark an enclosure, as the one at Jelling Denmark, the enclosed area would be gigantic and by far the biggest structure north of the Alps at this time. The poles were very wide and have been estimated to be at least 7 meters in length. The construction, however, belongs to the mid-5th century. It was consequently gone for many centuries when Adam of Bremen described the Uppsala temple. There is nothing to suggest a connection between these posts and Adam's temple, but the interpretations they have provoked are illustrative of how everything around Uppsala still tends to be interpreted in the shadow of his description.

== See also ==
- Domalde
- Fyrisvellir
