= Heimdall =

Norse deity

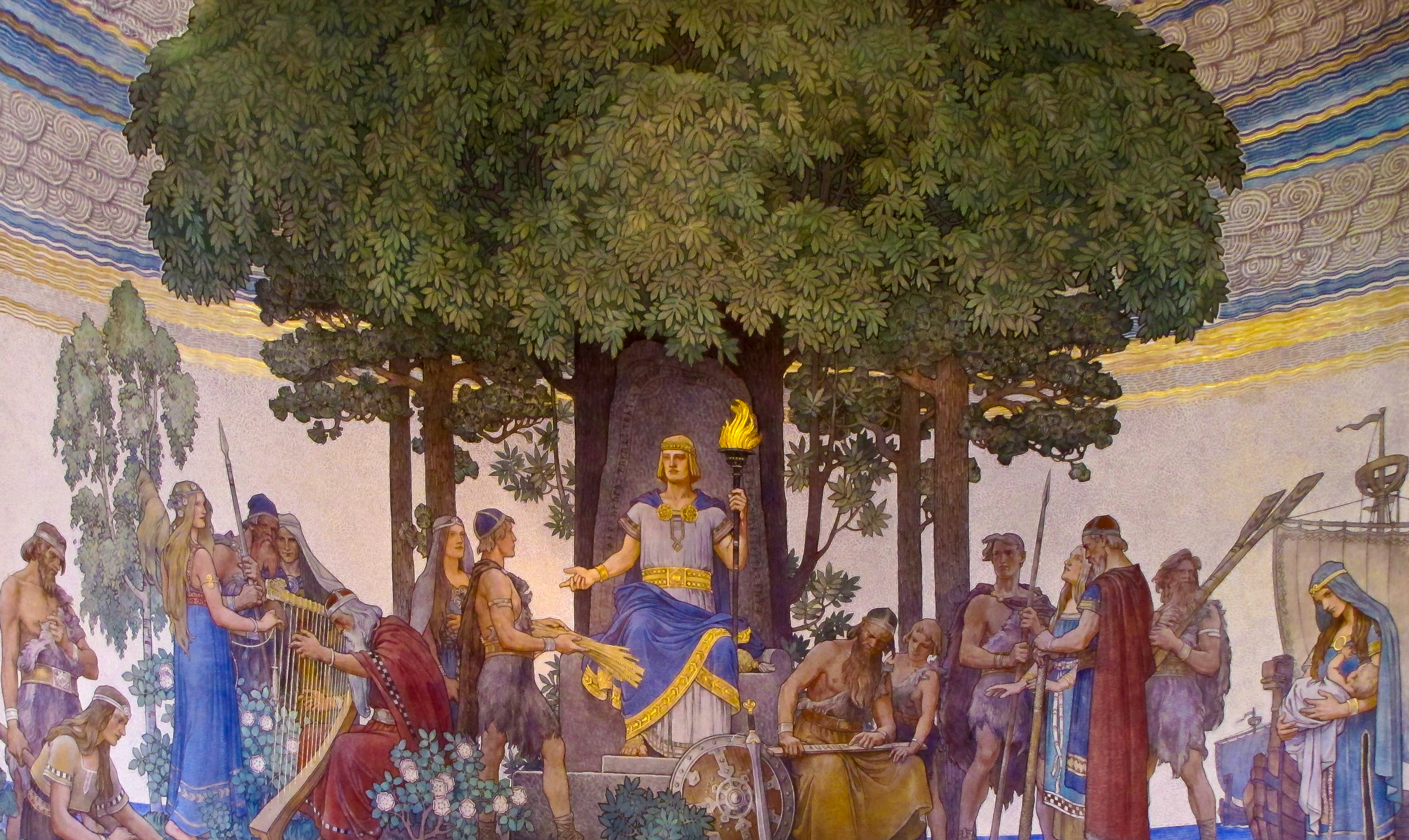
Heimdallr brings forth the gift of the gods to humanity (1907) by Nils Asplund

In Norse mythology, Heimdall (from Old Norse Heimdallr; modern Icelandic Heimdallur) is a god. He is the son of Odin and the Nine Sisters. Heimdall keeps watch for invaders and the onset of Ragnarök from his dwelling Himinbjörg, where the burning rainbow bridge Bifröst meets the sky. He is attested as possessing foreknowledge and keen senses, particularly eyesight and hearing. The god and his possessions are described in enigmatic manners. For example, Heimdall is golden-toothed, "the head is called his sword", and he is "the whitest of the gods".

Heimdall possesses the resounding horn Gjallarhorn and the golden-maned horse Gulltoppr, along with a store of mead at his dwelling. He is the son of nine mothers, and he is said to be the originator of social classes among humanity. Other notable stories include the recovery of Freyja's treasured possession Brísingamen while doing battle in the shape of a seal with Loki. The antagonistic relationship between Heimdall and Loki is notable, as they are foretold to kill one another during the events of Ragnarök. Heimdallr is also known as Rig, Hallinskiði, Gullintanni, and Vindlér or Vindhlér.

Heimdall is attested in the Poetic Edda, compiled in the 13th century from earlier traditional material; in the Prose Edda and Heimskringla, both written in the 13th century; in the poetry of skalds; and likely in a runic inscription on the Saltfleetby spindle-whorl found in England. Two lines of an otherwise lost poem about the god, Heimdalargaldr, survive. Due to the enigmatic nature of these attestations, scholars have produced various theories about the nature of the god, including his relation to sheep, borders, and waves.

== Names and etymology ==
The etymology of the name is obscure, but 'the one who illuminates the world' has been proposed. Heimdallr may be connected to Mardöll, one of Freyja's names. Heimdallr and its variants are usually anglicized as Heimdall (/ˈheɪmdɑːl/; with the nominative -r dropped).

Heimdall is attested as having three other names; Hallinskiði, Gullintanni, and Vindlér or Vindhlér. The name Hallinskiði is obscure, but has resulted in a series of attempts at deciphering it. Gullintanni literally means 'the one with the golden teeth'. Vindlér (or Vindhlér) translates as either 'the one protecting against the wind' or 'wind-sea'. All three have resulted in numerous theories about the god.

== Attestations ==
=== Saltfleetby spindle-whorl inscription ===
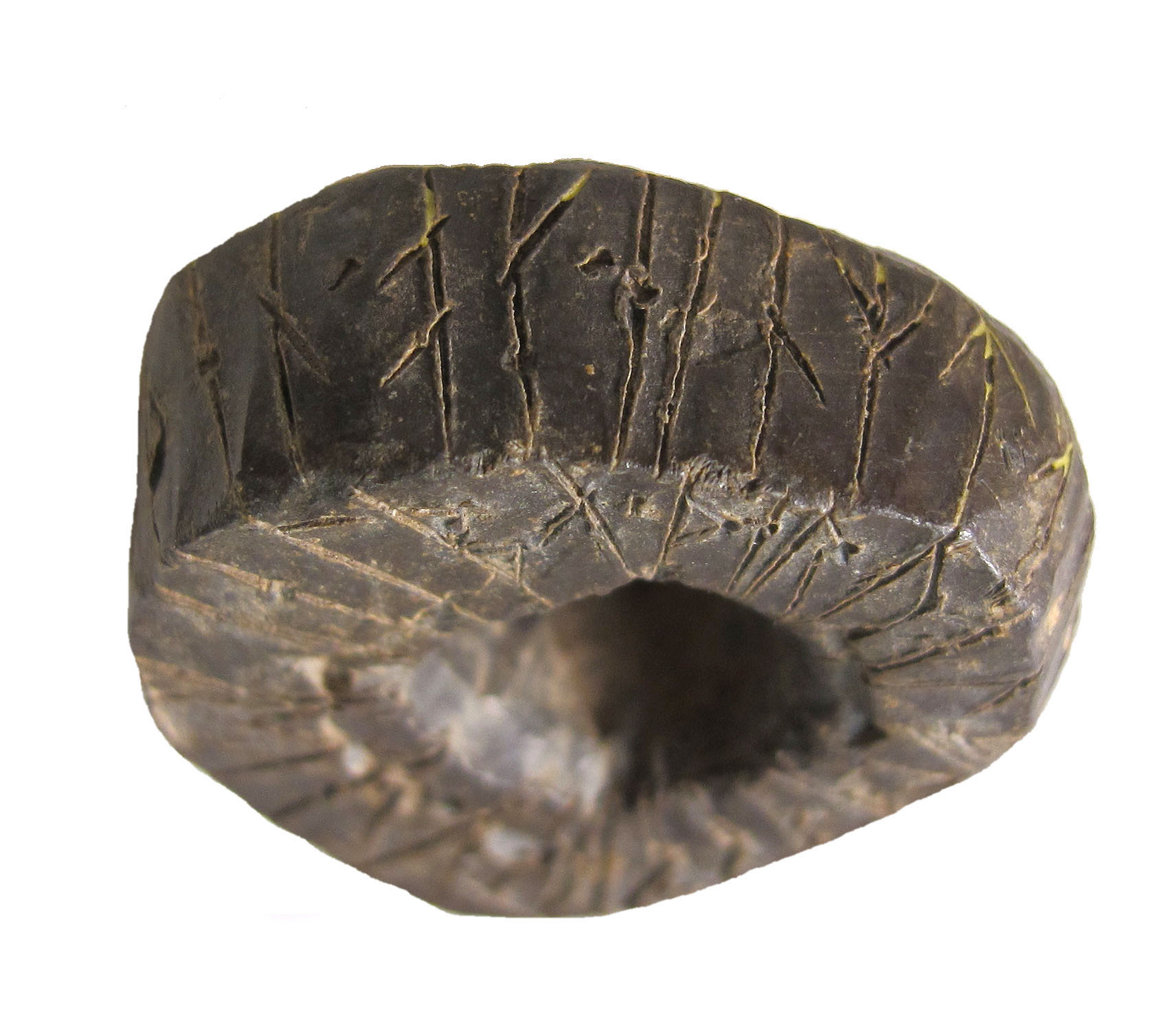
The Saltfleetby spindle whorl, from Lincolnshire in England, possibly recording the name of Heimdall.

Heimdallr is likely mentioned on the Saltfleetby spindle-whorl, a lead spindle whorl bearing an Old Norse Younger Fuþark inscription that was discovered in Saltfleetby in eastern England in 2010. The spindle-whorl itself is dated from the 10th to 12th centuries CE, with the writing possibly being added significantly after the object was made. Whilst there are difficulties in interpreting the inscription, it likely records a charm asking for help from Odin, Heimdallr and Þalfa, a figure whose name closely resembles that of Þjálfi, one of Thor's servants. The religion of the writer is debated, with the invoking of Germanic gods not procluding adherence to Christianity, but also possibly attesting to the continuing of Old Nordic religion in some English communities significantly after the establishment of Christianity in the region.

=== Poetic Edda ===
In the Poetic Edda, Heimdall is attested in six poems; Völuspá, Grímnismál, Lokasenna, Þrymskviða, Rígsþula, and Hrafnagaldr Óðins.

Heimdall is mentioned three times in Völuspá. In the first stanza of the poem, the undead völva reciting the poem calls out for listeners to be silent and refers to the Norse god:

Benjamin Thorpe translation:

For silence I pray all sacred children,
great and small, sons of Heimdall.
they will that I Valfather's deeds recount,
men's ancient saws, those that I best remember.

Henry Adams Bellows translation:

Hearing I ask from the holy races,
From Heimdall's sons, both high and low;
Thou wilt, Valfather, that well I relate.
Old tales I remember of men long ago.

This stanza has led to various scholarly interpretations. The "holy races" have been considered variously as either humanity or the gods. The notion of humanity as "Heimdall's sons" is otherwise unattested and has also resulted in various interpretations. Some scholars have pointed to the prose introduction to the poem Rígsþula, where Heimdall is said to have once gone about people, slept between couples, and so doled out classes among them (see Rígsthula section below).

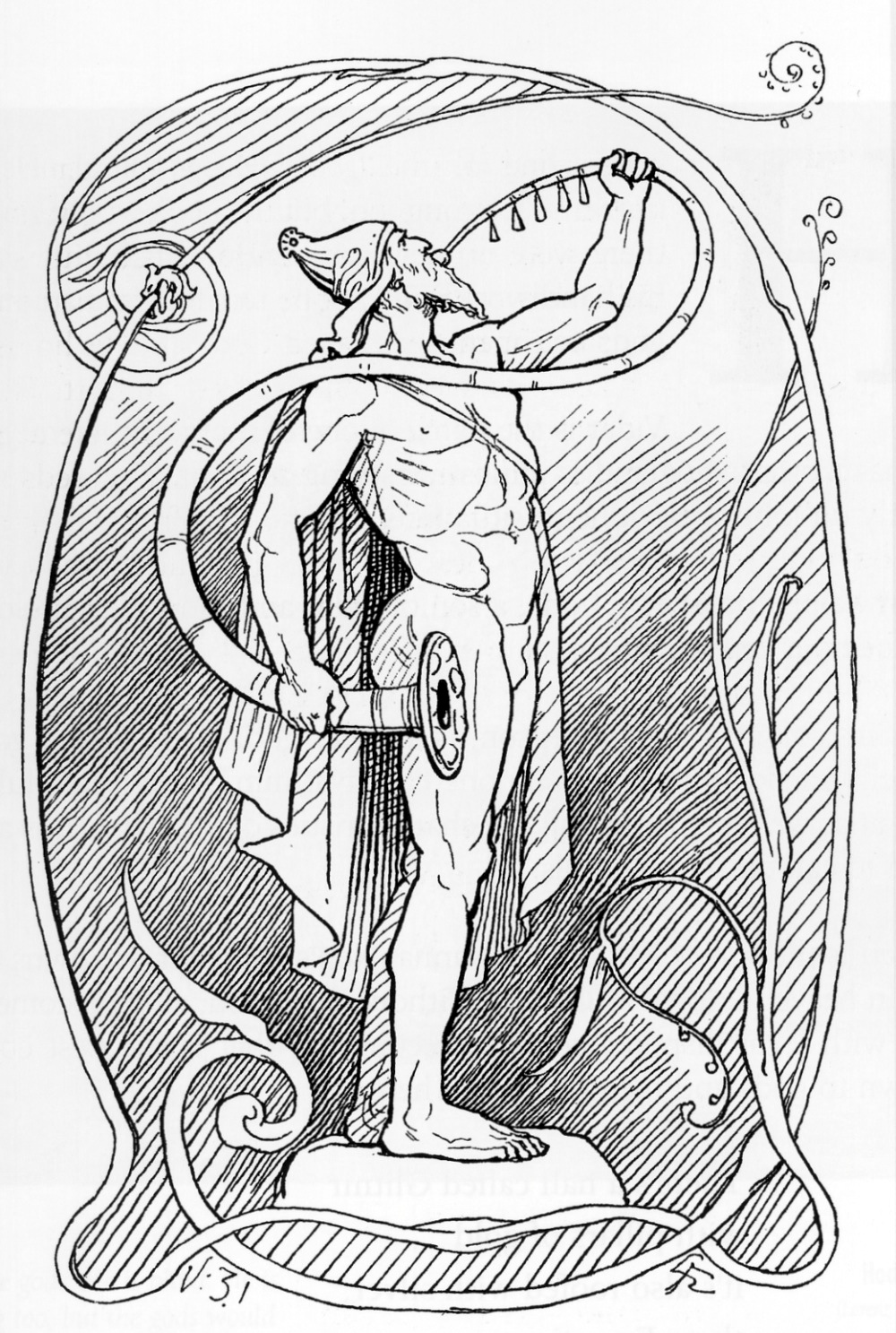
Heimdall blows Gjallarhorn in an 1895 illustration by Lorenz Frølich.

Later in Völuspá, the völva foresees the events of Ragnarök and the role in which Heimdall and Gjallarhorn will play at its onset; Heimdall will raise his horn and blow loudly. Due to manuscript differences, translations of the stanza vary:

Benjamin Thorpe translation:

Mim's sons dance,
but the central tree takes fire,
at the resounding Giallar-horn.
Loud blows Heimdall,
his horn is raised; Odin speaks with Mim's head.

Henry Adams Bellows translation:

Fast move the sons of Mim and fate
Is heard in the note of the Gjallarhorn;
Loud blows Heimdall, the horn is aloft,
In fear quake all who on Hel-roads are.

Regarding this stanza, scholar Andy Orchard comments that the name Gjallarhorn may here mean "horn of the river Gjöll" as "Gjöll is the name of one of the rivers of the Underworld, whence much wisdom is held to derive", but notes that in the poem Grímnismál Heimdall is said to drink fine mead in his heavenly home Himinbjörg.

Earlier in the same poem, the völva mentions a scenario involving the hearing or horn (depending on translation of the Old Norse noun hljóð—translations bolded below for the purpose of illustration) of the god Heimdall:

Benjamin Thorpe translation: She knows that **Heimdall's horn** is hidden under the heaven-bright holy tree. A river she sees flow, with foamy fall, from Valfather's pledge. Understand ye yet, or what?	Henry Adams Bellows translation: I know of the **horn of Heimdall**, hidden Under the high-reaching holy tree; On it there pours from Valfather's pledge A mighty stream: would you know yet more?	Carolyne Larrington translation: She knows that **Heimdall's hearing** is hidden under the radiant, sacred tree; she sees, pouring down, the muddy torrent from the wager of Father of the Slain; do you understand yet, or what more?

Scholar Paul Schach comments that the stanzas in this section of Völuspá are "all very mysterious and obscure, as it was perhaps meant to be". Schach details that "Heimdallar hljóð has aroused much speculation. Snorri [in the Prose Edda] seems to have confused this word with gjallarhorn, but there is otherwise no attestation of the use of hljóð in the sense of 'horn' in Icelandic. Various scholars have read this as "hearing" rather than "horn".

Scholar Carolyne Larrington comments that if "hearing" rather than "horn" is understood to appear in this stanza, the stanza indicates that Heimdall, like Odin, has left a body part in the well; his ear. Larrington says that "Odin exchanged one of his eyes for wisdom from Mimir, guardian of the well, while Heimdall seems to have forfeited his ear."

In the poem Grímnismál, Odin (disguised as Grímnir), tortured, starved and thirsty, tells the young Agnar of a number of mythological locations. The eighth location he mentions is Himinbjörg, where he says that Heimdall drinks fine mead:

Benjamin Thorpe translation:

Himinbiörg is the eighth, where Heimdall,
it is said, rules o'er the holy fanes:
there the gods' watchman, in his tranquil home,
drinks joyful the good mead.

Henry Adams Bellows translation:

Himingbjorg is the eighth, and Heimdall there
O'er men holds sway, it is said;
In his well-built house does the warder of heaven
The good mead gladly drink.

Regarding the above stanza, Henry Adams Bellows comments that "in this stanza the two functions of Heimdall—as father of humanity [ . . . ] and as warder of the gods—seem both to be mentioned, but the second line in the manuscripts is apparently in bad shape, and in the editions it is more or less conjecture".

In the poem Lokasenna, Loki flyts with various gods who have met together to feast. At one point during the exchanges, the god Heimdall says that Loki is drunk and witless, and asks Loki why he won't stop speaking. Loki tells Heimdall to be silent, that he was fated a "hateful life", that Heimdall must always have a muddy back, and that he must serve as watchman of the gods. The goddess Skaði interjects and the flyting continues in turn.

The poem Þrymskviða tells of Thor's loss of his hammer, Mjöllnir, to the jötnar and quest to get it back. At one point in the tale, the gods gather at the thing and debate how to get Thor's hammer back from the jötnar, who demand the beautiful goddess Freyja in return for it. Heimdall advises that they simply dress Thor up as Freyja, during which he is described as hvítastr ása (translations of the phrase vary below) and is said to have foresight like the Vanir, a group of gods:

Benjamin Thorpe translation:

Then said Heimdall, of Æsir brightest—
he well foresaw, like other Vanir—
Let us clothe Thor with bridal raiment,
let him have the famed Brîsinga necklace.
"Let by his side keys jingle,
and woman's weeds fall around his knees,
but on his breast place precious stones,
and a neat coif set on his head."

Henry Adams Bellows translation:

Then Heimdall spake, whitest of the gods,
Like the Wanes he knew the future well:
"Bind we on Thor the bridal veil,
Let him bear the mighty Brisings' necklace;
"Keys around him let there rattle,
And down to his knees hang woman's dress;
With gems full broad upon his breast,
And a pretty cap to crown his head."

Jeramy Dodds translation:

The most glittering of gods, Heimdall, who,
like the Vanir, is gifted with the gift of foresight,
said: 'Let's strap a bridal veil over Thor's face
and let him don the Brising necklace.
'Let the wedlock keys jingle around his waist,
and dress him in a woman's dress to his knees
and loop giant gems across his chest
and top him off with a stylish headdress.'

Regarding Heimdall's status as hvítastr ása (variously translated above as "brightest" (Thorpe), "whitest" (Bellows), and "most glittering" (Dodds)) and the comparison to the Vanir, scholar John Lindow comments that there are no other indications of Heimdall being considered among the Vanir (on Heimdall's status as "hvítastr ása ", see "scholarly reception" below).

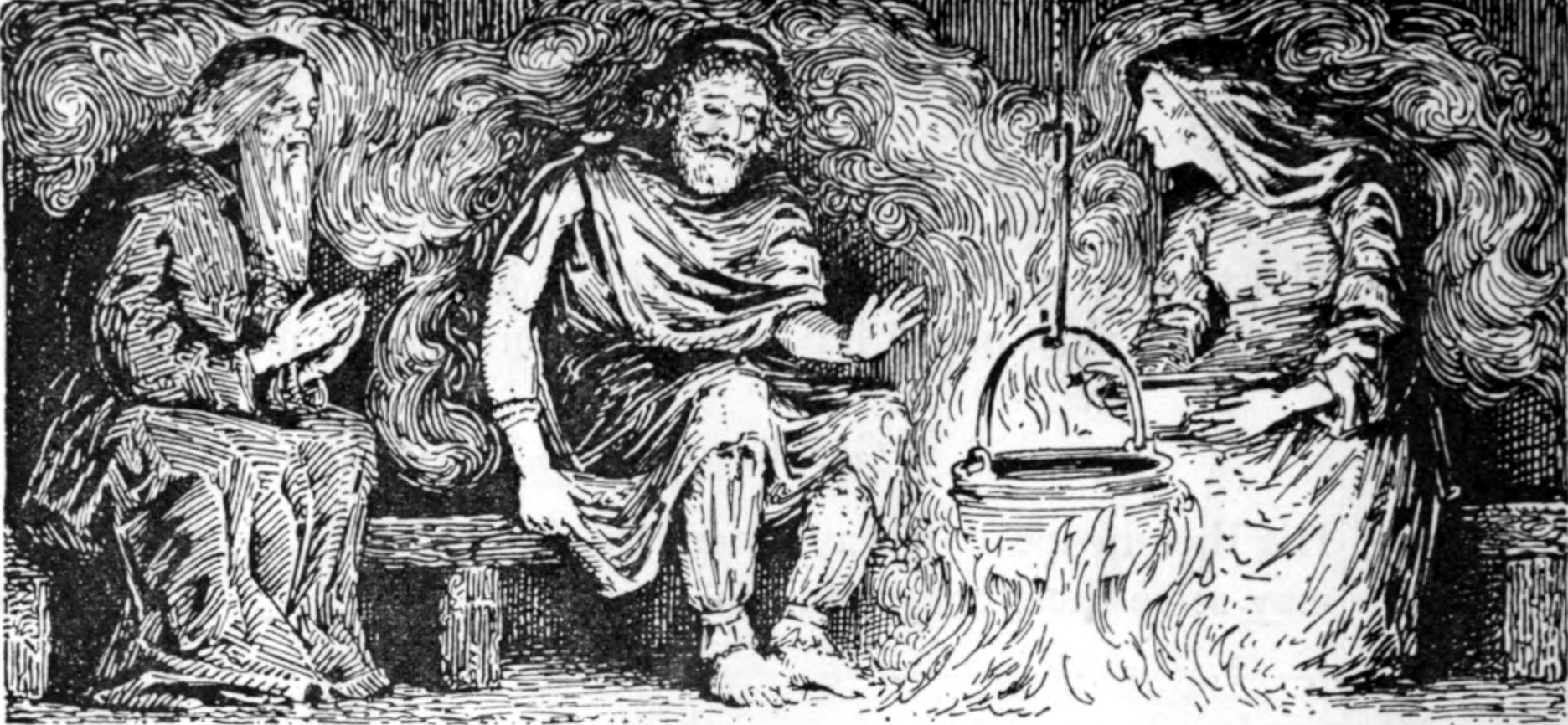
Rig in Great-grandfather's Cottage (1908) by W. G. Collingwood

The introductory prose to the poem Rígsþula says that "people say in the old stories" that Heimdall, described as a god among the Æsir, once fared on a journey. Heimdall wandered along a seashore, and referred to himself as Rígr. In the poem, Rígr, who is described as a wise and powerful god, walks in the middle of roads on his way to steads, where he meets a variety of couples and dines with them, giving them advice and spending three nights at a time between them in their bed. The wives of the couples become pregnant, and from them come the various classes of humanity.

Eventually a warrior home produces a promising boy, and as the boy grows older, Rígr comes out of a thicket, teaches the boy runes, gives him a name, and proclaims him to be his son. Rígr tells him to strike out and get land for himself. The boy does so, and so becomes a great war leader with many estates. He marries a beautiful woman and the two have many children and are happy. One of the children eventually becomes so skilled that he is able to share in runic knowledge with Heimdall, and so earns the title of Rígr himself. The poem breaks off without further mention of the god.

=== Prose Edda ===
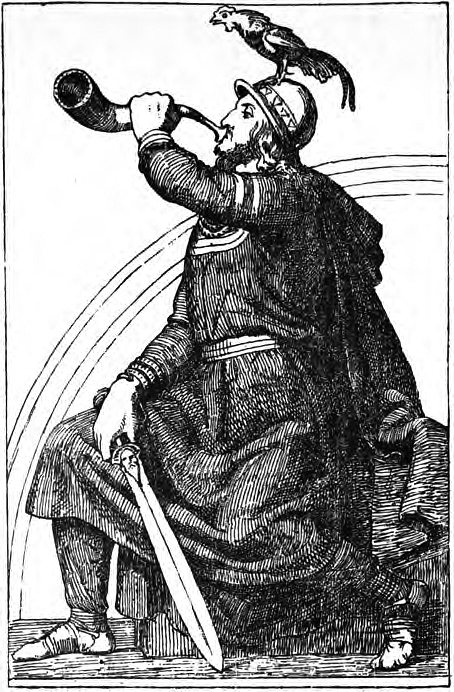
The cock Gullinkambi atop his head and the burning rainbow bridge Bifröst in the background, Heimdall blows into Gjallarhorn while holding a sword with a man's face on it (a reference to the "man's head" kenning). Illustration (1907) by J. T. Lundbye.

In the Prose Edda, Heimdall is mentioned in the books Gylfaginning, Skáldskaparmál, and Háttatal. In Gylfaginning, the enthroned figure of High tells the disguised mythical king Gangleri of various gods, and, in chapter 25, mentions Heimdall. High says that Heimdall is known as "the white As", is "great and holy", and that nine maidens, all sisters, gave birth to him. Heimdall is called Hallinskiði and Gullintanni ('gold-tooth'); he had gold teeth. High continues that Heimdall lives in "a place" called Himinbjörg and that it is near Bifröst. Heimdall is the watchman of the gods, and he sits on the edge of heaven to guard the Bifröst bridge from the berg jötnar. Heimdall requires less sleep than a bird, can see at night just as well as if it were day, and for over a hundred leagues. Heimdall's hearing is also quite keen; he can hear grass as it grows on the earth, wool as it grows on sheep, and anything louder. Heimdall possesses a trumpet, Gjallarhorn, that, when blown, can be heard in all worlds, and "the head is referred to as Heimdall's sword". High then quotes the above-mentioned Grímnismál stanza about Himinbjörg and provides two lines from the otherwise lost poem about Heimdall, Heimdalargaldr, in which he proclaims himself to be the son of Nine Mothers.

In chapter 49, High tells of the god Baldr's funeral procession. Various deities are mentioned as having attended, including Heimdall, who rode his horse Gulltopr.

In chapter 51, High foretells the events of Ragnarök. After the enemies of the gods will gather at the plain Vígríðr, Heimdall will stand and mightily blow into Gjallarhorn. The gods will awake and assemble together at the thing. At the end of the battle between various gods and their enemies, Heimdall will face Loki and they will kill one another. After, the world will be engulfed in flames. High then quotes the above-mentioned stanza regarding Heimdall raising his horn in Völuspá.

At the beginning of Skáldskaparmál, Heimdall is mentioned as having attended a banquet in Asgard with various other deities. Later in the book, a citation from Húsdrápa, a poem by 10th-century skald Úlfr Uggason, describes Heimdall riding to Baldr's funeral pyre.

In chapter 8, means of referring to Heimdall are provided: "son of nine mothers", "guardian of the gods", "the white As" (see Poetic Edda discussion regarding hvítastr ása above), "Loki's enemy", and "recoverer of Freyja's necklace". The section adds that the poem Heimdalargaldr is about him, and that, since the poem, "the head has been called Heimdall's doom: man's doom is an expression for sword". Heimdallr is the owner of Gulltoppr, is also known as Vindhlér, and is a son of Odin. Heimdall visits Vágasker and Singasteinn and there vied with Loki for Brísingamen. According to the chapter, the skald Úlfr Uggason composed a large section of his Húsdrápa about these events and that Húsdrápa says that the two were in the shape of seals. A few chapters later, ways of referring to Loki are provided, including "wrangler with Heimdall and Skadi", and section of Úlfr Uggason's Húsdrápa is then provided in reference:

Renowned defender [Heimdall] of the powers' way [Bifrost], kind of counsel, competes with Farbauti's terribly sly son at Singastein. Son of eight mothers plus one, might of mood, is first to get hold of the beautiful sea-kidney [jewel, Brisingamen]. I announce it in strands of praise.

The chapter points out that in the above Húsdrápa section Heimdall is said to be the son of nine mothers.

Heimdall is mentioned once in Háttatal. There, in a composition by Snorri Sturluson, a sword is referred to as "Vindhlér's helmet-filler", meaning "Heimdall's head".

=== Heimskringla ===
In Ynglinga saga compiled in Heimskringla, Snorri presents a euhemerized origin of the Norse gods and rulers descending from them. In chapter 5, Snorri asserts that the Æsir settled in what is now Sweden and built various temples. Snorri writes that Odin settled in Lake Logrin "at a place which formerly was called Sigtúnir. There he erected a large temple and made sacrifices according to the custom of the Æsir. He took possession of the land as far as he had called it Sigtúnir. He gave dwelling places to the temple priests." Snorri adds that, after this, Njörðr dwelt in Nóatún, Freyr dwelt in Uppsala, Heimdall at Himinbjörg, Thor at Þrúðvangr, Baldr at Breiðablik and that to everyone Odin gave fine estates.

== Visual depictions ==
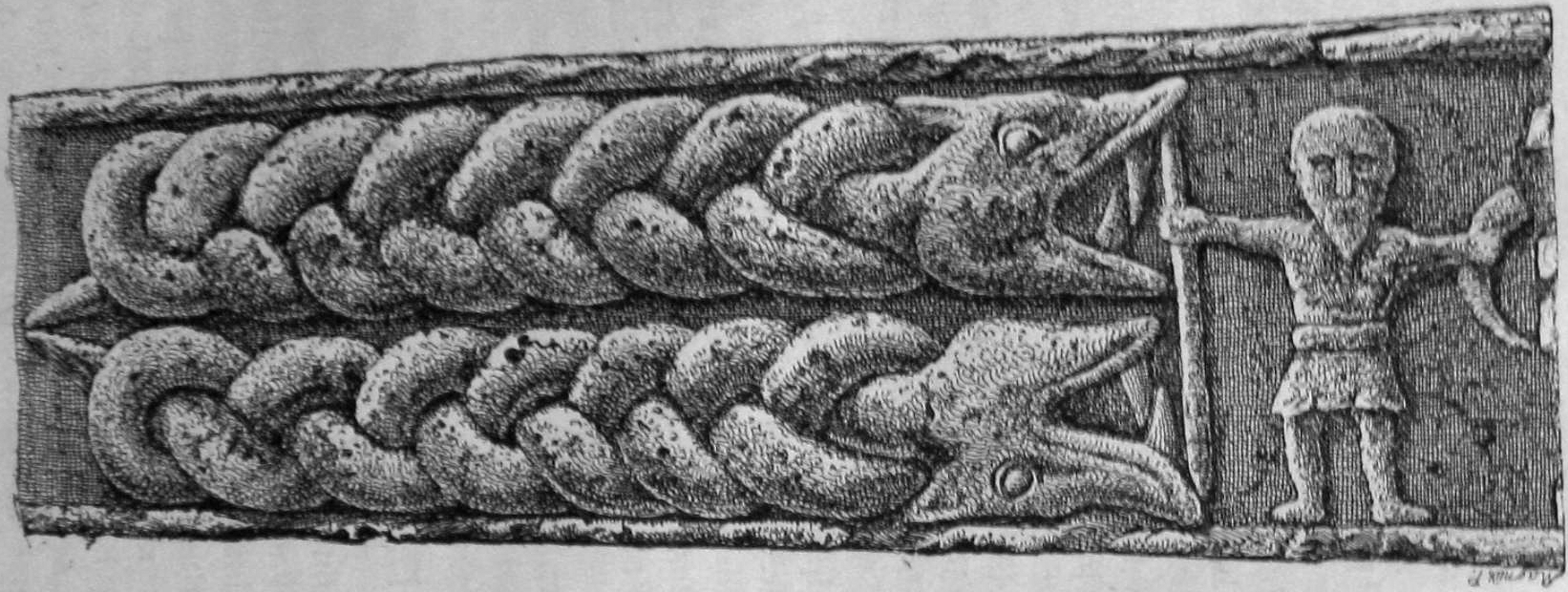
The Gosforth Cross panel often held to depict Heimdall with Gjallarhorn

A figure holding a large horn to his lips and clasping a sword on his hip appears on a stone cross from the Isle of Man. Some scholars have theorized that this figure is a depiction of Heimdall with Gjallarhorn.

The 9th or 10th century Gosforth Cross in Cumbria, England depicts a figure holding a horn and a long object, variously interpreted as a spear or sword, standing defiantly before two open-mouthed beasts. This figure has been often theorized as depicting Heimdall with Gjallarhorn.

== Scholarly reception ==
Heimdall's attestations have proven troublesome and enigmatic to interpret for scholars. A variety of sources describe the god as born from Nine Mothers, a puzzling description (for more in-depth discussion, see Nine Mothers of Heimdallr). Various scholars have interpreted this as a reference to the Nine Daughters of Ægir and Rán, personifications of waves. This would therefore mean Heimdall is born from the waves, an example of a deity born from the sea.

In the textual corpus, Heimdall is frequently described as maintaining a particular association with boundaries, borders, and liminal spaces, both spatial and temporal. For example, Gylfaginning describes the god as guarding the border of the land of the gods, Heimdall meets humankind at a coast, and, if accepted as describing Heimdall, Völuspá hin skamma describes him as born 'at the edge of the world' in 'days of yore' by the Nine Daughters of Ægir and Rán, and it is Heimdall's horn that signals the transition to the events of Ragnarök.

Additionally, Heimdall has a particular association with male sheep, rams. A form of the deity's name, Heimdali, occurs twice as a name for 'ram' in Skáldskaparmál, as does Heimdall's name Hallinskíði. Heimdall's unusual physical description has also been seen by various scholars as fitting this association: As mentioned above, Heimdall is described as gold-toothed (by way of his name Gullintanni), as having the ability to hear grass grow and the growth of wool on sheep, and as owning a sword called 'head' (rams have horns on their heads). This may mean that Heimdall was associated with the ram perhaps as a sacred and/or sacrificial animal or that the ancient Scandinavians may have conceived of him as having been a ram in appearance.

All of these topics—Heimdall's birth, his association with borders and boundaries, and his connection to sheep—have led to significant discussion among scholars. For example, influential philologist and folklorist Georges Dumézil, comparing motifs and clusters of motifs in western Europe, proposes the following explanation for Heimdall's birth and association with rams (italics are Dumézil's own):

Many folklores compare waves which, under a strong wind, are topped with white foam ... to different animals, especially to horses or mares, to cows or bulls, to dogs or sheep. We say in France, "moutons, moutonner, moutannant" (white sheep, to break into white sheep, breaking into white sheep) and the English "white horses". The modern Welsh, like the Irish, speak of "white mares (cesyg)" but the old tradition linked to the name of Gwenhidwy, as in French, Basque, and other folklores, turned these waves into sheep. Conversely, in many countries the sailors or the coast dwellers attribute to certain wave sequences particular qualities or forces, sometimes, even, ... a supernatural power: it happens that the third, or the ninth, or the tenth wave is the biggest, or the most dangerous, or the noisiest or the most powerful. But what I have found nowhere else but in the Welsh tradition concerning Gwenhidwy is a combination of these two beliefs, the final result of which is to make the ninth wave the ram of the simple ewes that are the eight preceding waves.

This concept furnishes a satisfactory explanation of that section of Heimdall's dossier which we are considering: it allows us to combine his birth—nine mothers who are waves, at the confines of the earth—and his attributes of a ram. We understand that whatever his mythical value and functions were, the scene of his birth made him, in the sea's white frothing, the ram produced by the ninth wave.

== In popular culture ==
As with many aspects of Norse mythology, Heimdall has appeared in many modern works. Heimdall appears as a character in Marvel Comics and is portrayed in the film versions by English actor Idris Elba.

Heimdall is the namesake of a crater on Callisto, a moon of Jupiter.

Heimdall is the protagonist of an eponymous video game released in 1991 and its 1994 sequel, Heimdall 2. In the 2002 Ensemble Studios game Age of Mythology, Heimdall is one of 12 gods the Norse can choose to worship. Heimdallr is one of the playable gods in the multiplayer online battle arena game Smite. Heimdall also appears as an antagonist in the 2022 action-adventure video game God of War Ragnarök and is played by the American actor Scott Porter. In the live action Amazon Prime Video adaptation of God of War, the role will be played by Max Parker.

== See also ==
- Heimdall (character)
- List of Germanic deities
- Germanic mythology
