= Bifröst =

Rainbow bridge between Asgard and Midgard

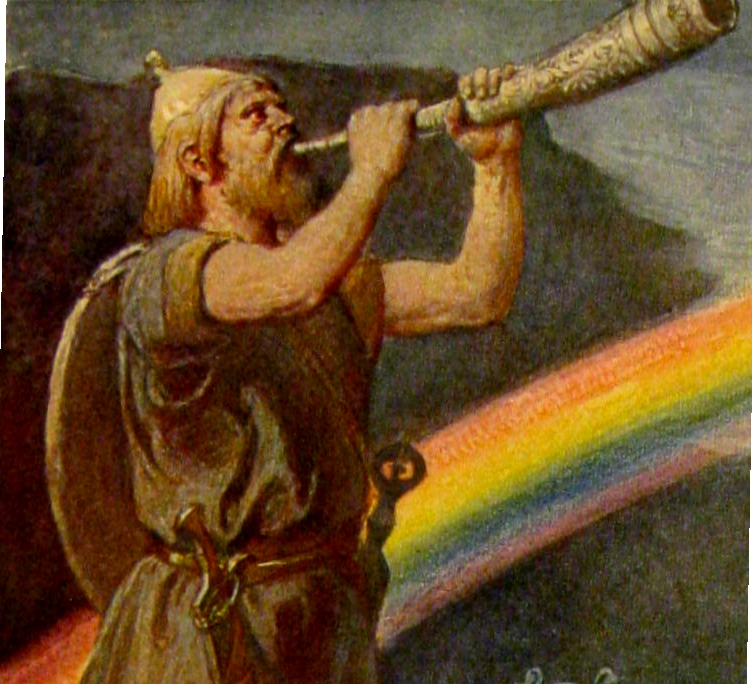
The god Heimdallr stands before the rainbow bridge while blowing his horn (1905) by Emil Doepler.

In Norse mythology, Bifrost (/ˈbɪvrɒst/; Old Norse: Bifrǫst [ˈbiv.rɔst], Icelandic: Bifröst or Bilröst) is a burning bridge that reaches between Midgard (Earth) and Asgard, the realm of the gods. The bridge is attested as Bilröst in the Poetic Edda, compiled in the 13th century from earlier traditional sources; as Bifröst in the Prose Edda, written in the 13th century by Snorri Sturluson; and in the poetry of skalds. Both the Poetic Edda and the Prose Edda also refer to the bridge as Ásbrú (Old Norse "Æsir's bridge" or "bridge of the gods").

According to the Prose Edda, the bridge ends in heaven at Himinbjörg, the residence of the god Heimdall, who guards it from the jötnar. The bridge's destruction during Ragnarök by the forces of Muspell is foretold. Modern retellings identify the bridge with the rainbow, but scholars have proposed that the bridge may have originally represented the Milky Way and have noted parallels between the bridge and another bridge in Norse mythology, Gjallarbrú.

== Etymology ==
Scholar Andy Orchard suggests that Bifröst may mean "shimmering path". He notes that the first element of Bilröst—bil (meaning "a moment")—"suggests the fleeting nature of the rainbow", which he connects to the first element of Bifröst—the Old Norse verb bifa (meaning "to shimmer" or "to shake")—noting that the element evokes notions of the "lustrous sheen" of the bridge. Austrian Germanist Rudolf Simek says that Bifröst either means "the swaying road to heaven" (also citing bifa) or, if Bilröst is the original form of the two (which Simek says is likely), "the fleetingly glimpsed rainbow" (possibly connected to bil, perhaps meaning "moment, weak point").

== Attestations ==
Two poems in the Poetic Edda and two books in the Prose Edda provide information about the bridge:

=== Poetic Edda ===
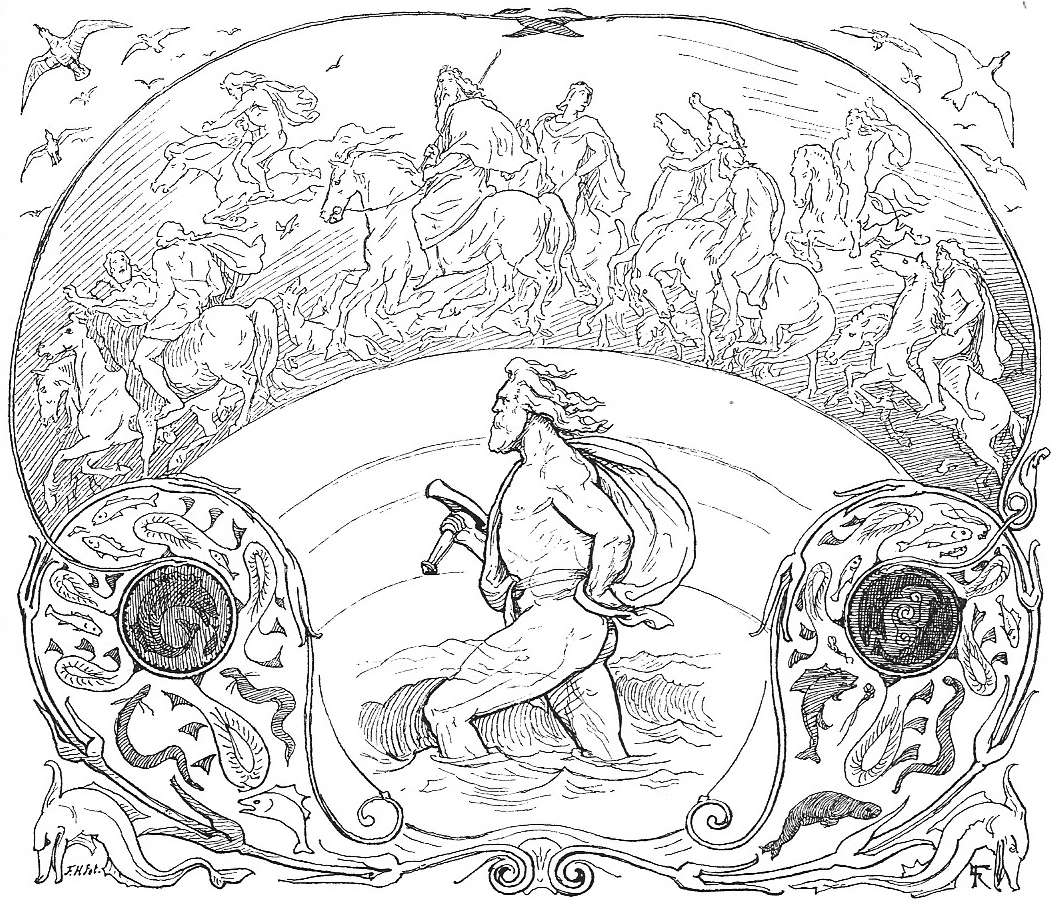
Thor wades through rivers while the rest of the æsir ride across Bifröst (1895) by Lorenz Frølich.

In the Poetic Edda, the bridge is mentioned in the poems Grímnismál and Fáfnismál, where it is referred to as Bilröst. In one of two stanzas in the poem Grímnismál that mentions the bridge, Grímnir (the god Odin in disguise) provides the young Agnarr with cosmological knowledge, including that Bilröst is the best of bridges. Later in Grímnismál, Grímnir notes that Asbrú "burns all with flames" and that, every day, the god Thor wades through the waters of Körmt and Örmt and the two Kerlaugar:

Körmt and Ormt, and the Kerlaugs twain:
these Thor must wade
each day, when he to council goes
at Yggdrasil's ash;
for as the As-bridge is all on fire,
the holy waters boil.

— Benjamin Thorpe translation
Translation:

Kormt and Ormt and the Kerlaugs twain
Shall Thor each day wade through,
(When dooms to give he forth shall go
To the ash-tree Yggdrasil;)
For heaven's bridge burns all in flame,
And the sacred waters seethe.

— Henry Adams Bellows translation

In Fáfnismál, the dying wyrm Fafnir tells the hero Sigurd that, during the events of Ragnarök, bearing spears, gods will meet at Óskópnir. From there, the gods will cross Bilröst, which will break apart as they cross over it, causing their horses to dredge through an immense river.

=== Prose Edda ===
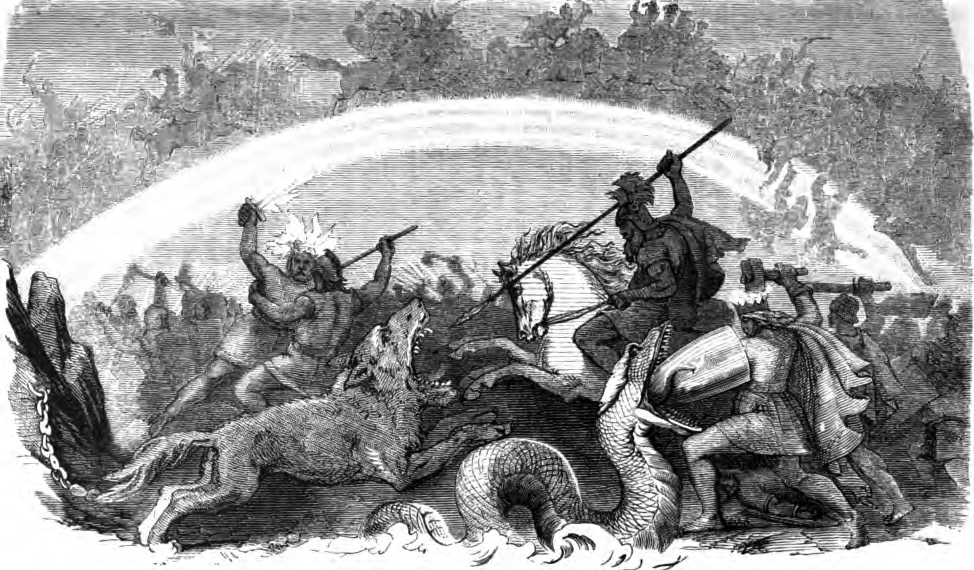
Bifröst appears in the background as the gods do battle in Battle of the Doomed Gods (1882) by Friedrich Wilhelm Heine.

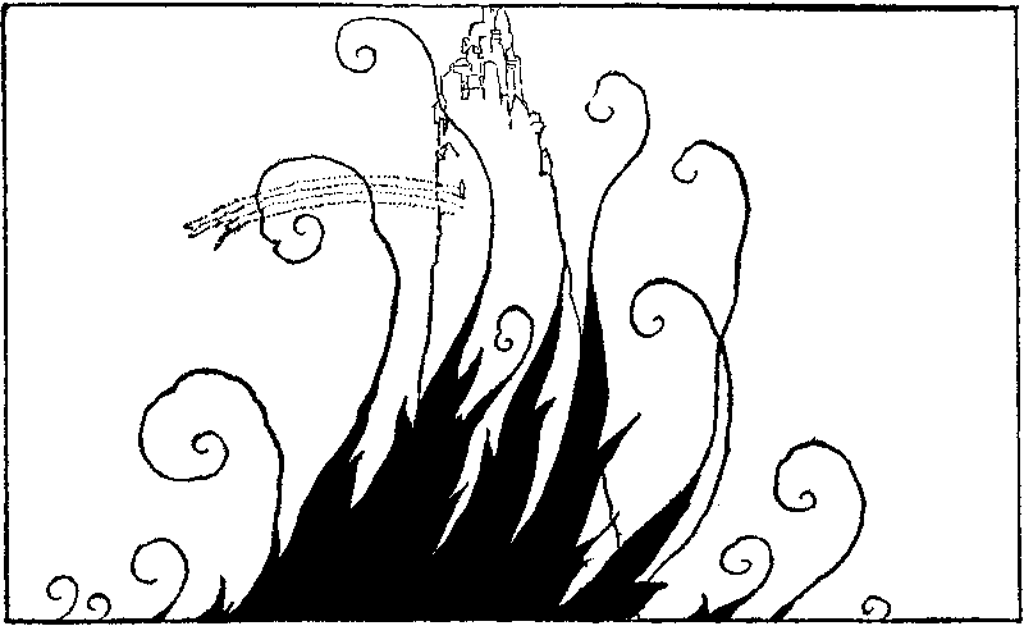
Bifröst is shattered in The Twilight of the Gods (1920) by Willy Pogany.

The bridge is mentioned in the Prose Edda books Gylfaginning and Skáldskaparmál, where it is referred to as Bifröst. In chapter 13 of Gylfaginning, Gangleri (King Gylfi in disguise) asks the enthroned figure of High what way exists between heaven and earth. Laughing, High replies that the question is not an intelligent one, and goes on to explain that the gods built a bridge from heaven and earth. He incredulously asks Gangleri if he has not heard the story before. High says that Gangleri must have seen it, and notes that Gangleri may call it a rainbow. High says that the bridge consists of three colors, has great strength, "and is built with art and skill to a greater extent than other constructions."

High notes that, although the bridge is strong, it will break when "Muspell's lads" attempt to cross it, and their horses will have to make do with swimming over "great rivers". Gangleri says that it does not seem that the gods "built the bridge in good faith if it is liable to break, considering that they can do as they please." High responds that the gods do not deserve blame for the breaking of the bridge, for "there is nothing in this world that will be secure when Muspell's sons attack."

In chapter 15 of Gylfaginning, Just-As-High says that Bifröst is also called Asbrú, and that every day the gods ride their horses across it (with the exception of Thor, who instead wades through the boiling waters of the rivers Körmt and Örmt) to reach Urðarbrunnr, a holy well where the gods have their court. As a reference, Just-As-High quotes the second of the two stanzas in Grímnismál that mention the bridge (see above). Gangleri asks if fire burns over Bifröst. High says that the red in the bridge is burning fire, and, without it, the frost jotnar and mountain jotnar would "go up into heaven" if anyone who wanted could cross Bifröst. High adds that, in heaven, "there are many beautiful places" and that "everywhere there has divine protection around it."

In chapter 17, High tells Gangleri that the location of Himinbjörg "stands at the edge of heaven where Bifrost reaches heaven." While describing the god Heimdallr in chapter 27, High says that Heimdallr lives in Himinbjörg by Bifröst, and guards the bridge from mountain jotnar while sitting at the edge of heaven. In chapter 34, High quotes the first of the two Grímnismál stanzas that mention the bridge. In chapter 51, High foretells the events of Ragnarök. High says that, during Ragnarök, the sky will split open, and from the split will ride forth the "sons of Muspell". When the "sons of Muspell" ride over Bifröst it will break, "as was said above".

In the Prose Edda book Skáldskaparmál, the bridge receives a single mention. In chapter 16, a work by the 10th century skald Úlfr Uggason is provided, where Bifröst is referred to as "the powers' way".

== Theories ==
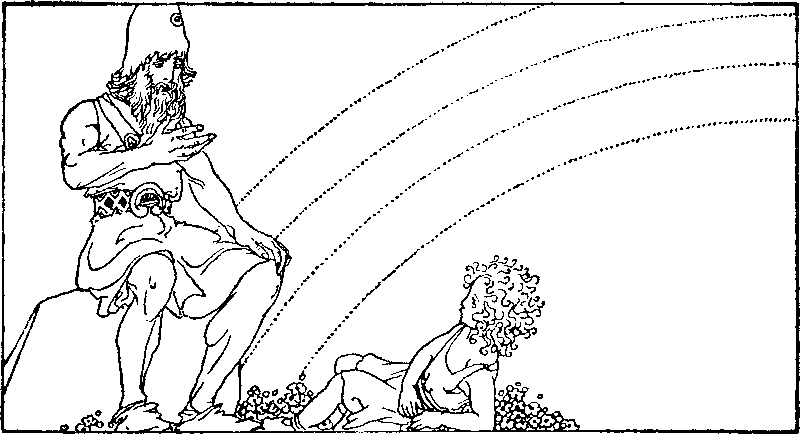
Bifröst in the background, Heimdallr explains to a young Hnoss how all things came to be (1920) by Willy Pogany.

In his translation of the Poetic Edda, Henry Adams Bellows comments that the Grímnismál stanza mentioning Thor and the bridge stanza may mean that "Thor has to go on foot in the last days of the destruction, when the bridge is burning. Another interpretation, however, is that when Thor leaves the heavens (i.e., when a thunder-storm is over) the rainbow-bridge becomes hot in the sun."

John Lindow points to a parallel between Bifröst, which he notes is "a bridge between earth and heaven, or earth and the world of the gods", and the bridge Gjallarbrú, "a bridge between earth and the underworld, or earth and the world of the dead." Several scholars have proposed that Bifröst may represent the Milky Way.

== Adaptations ==
In the final scene of Richard Wagner's 1869 opera Das Rheingold, the god Froh summons a rainbow bridge, over which the gods cross to enter Valhalla.

In J. R. R. Tolkien's legendarium, the "level bridge" of "The Fall of Númenor", an early version of the Akallabêth, recalls Bifröst. It departs from the earth at a tangent, allowing immortal Elves but not mortal Men to travel the Old Straight Road to the lost earthly paradise of Valinor after the world has been remade (from a flat plane to a sphere).

Bifröst appears in comic books associated with the Marvel Comics character Thor and in subsequent adaptations of those comic books. In the Marvel Cinematic Universe film Thor, Jane Foster describes the Bifröst as an Einstein–Rosen bridge, which functions as a means of transportation across space in a short period of time.

Bifröst has also appeared in games such as Hotline Miami 2: Wrong Number during The Son's last level in which he is under the influence of drugs and thus hallucinates Bifröst.

The Rainbow Bridge is often invoked in contemporary culture when referencing a recently deceased pet.

== See also ==
- Ame-no-ukihashi
