= Singasteinn =

Artifact in Norse mythology

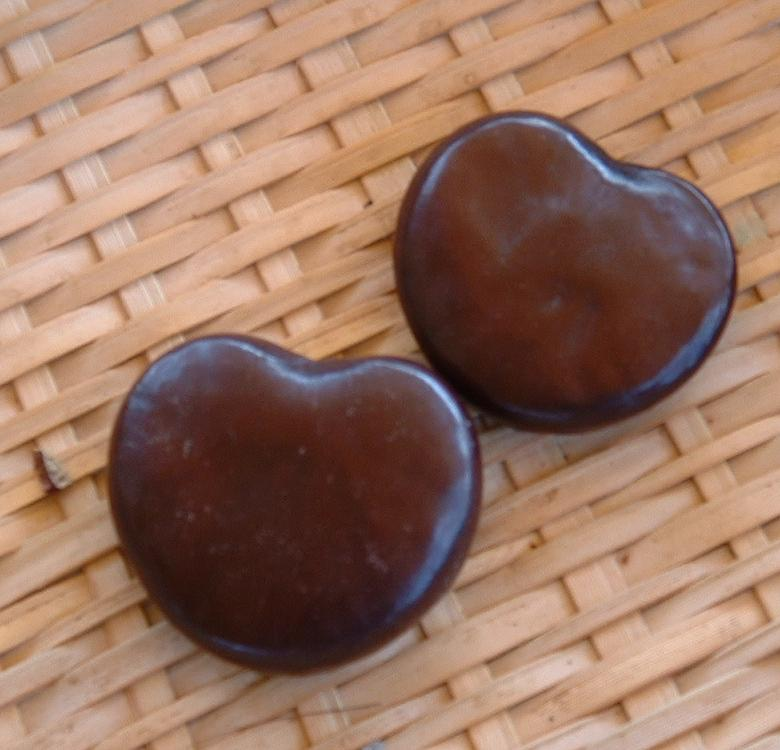
Entada Gigas (drift seeds) is one interpretation from the "beautiful sea-kidney" translation

In Norse mythology, Singasteinn (Old Norse "singing stone" or "chanting stone") is an object that appears in the account of Loki and Heimdall's fight in the form of seals. The object is solely attested in the skaldic poem Húsdrápa. Some scholars have interpreted it as the location of the struggle, others as the object they were struggling over.

== Húsdrápa ==
The scene is described in the skald Úlfr Uggason's Húsdrápa, as found in the 13th century Icelandic Prose Edda:

Old Norse: Ráðgegninn bregðr ragna rein at Singasteini frægr við firna slœgjan Fárbauta mǫg vári; móðǫflugr ræðr mœðra mǫgr hafnýra fǫgru, kynnik, áðr ok einnar átta, mærðar þǫ́ttum.	Arthur Gilchrist Brodeur's translation: The famed rain-bow's defender, Ready in wisdom, striveth At Singasteinn with Loki, Fárbauti's sin-sly offspring; The son of mothers eight and one, Mighty in wrath, possesses The Stone ere Loki cometh: I make known songs of praise.

== Interpretations ==
In the Prose Edda, Snorri Sturluson interprets Singasteinn as the skerry at which Loki and Heimdall fought. Referring to the same poem, he says that Heimdall may be called "Frequenter of Vágasker ["waves-skerry"] and Singasteinn"; this gives another name for the skerry and this is also where he states that they were in the form of seals, showing that there was more of the poem on this story. Brodeur has followed Snorri in his translation, and so have some scholarly analyses. For example, Gabriel Turville-Petre says, "Singasteinn was evidently a rock far out at sea." Viktor Rydberg, following Snorri in seeing the struggle as over Freyja's necklace Brísingamen, went a step further and saw the necklace as having been lying on the skerry.

Alternatively at singasteini has been taken to refer to what Heimdall and Loki were fighting over, parallel to the hafnýra fǫgru, "beautiful sea-kidney" (which Brodeur rendered as simply "stone"). In this light, there is an attractive emendation of singasteini to signasteini, "magic stone, amulet." Several scholars have pointed out that both "sea-kidney" and "magic stone" fit less well with Brísingamen, a necklace, than with Caribbean drift-seeds that can be found on the beaches of Iceland, Orkney, the Hebrides and the Scandinavian mainland and have been traditionally used as amulets, particularly to ease childbirth; their European names include vettenyrer, wight (Old Norse vættr) kidneys.

== Sources ==
- Kurt Schier. "Húsdrápa 2. Heimdall, Loki und die Meerniere." in Helmut Birkhan, ed. Festgabe für Otto Höfler zum 75. Geburtstag. Philologica Germanica 3. Vienna: Braumüller, 1976. ISBN 978-3-7003-0131-8. 577–88 - an influential exposition of the location interpretation (in German).
- Birger Pering. Heimdall: Religionsgeschichtliche Untersuchungen zum Verständnis der altnordischen Götterwelt. Diss. Lund University. Lund: Gleerup, 1941. OCLC 459397212 - the first exposition of the birthstone interpretation (in German).
