= Kerlaugar =

Mythological river

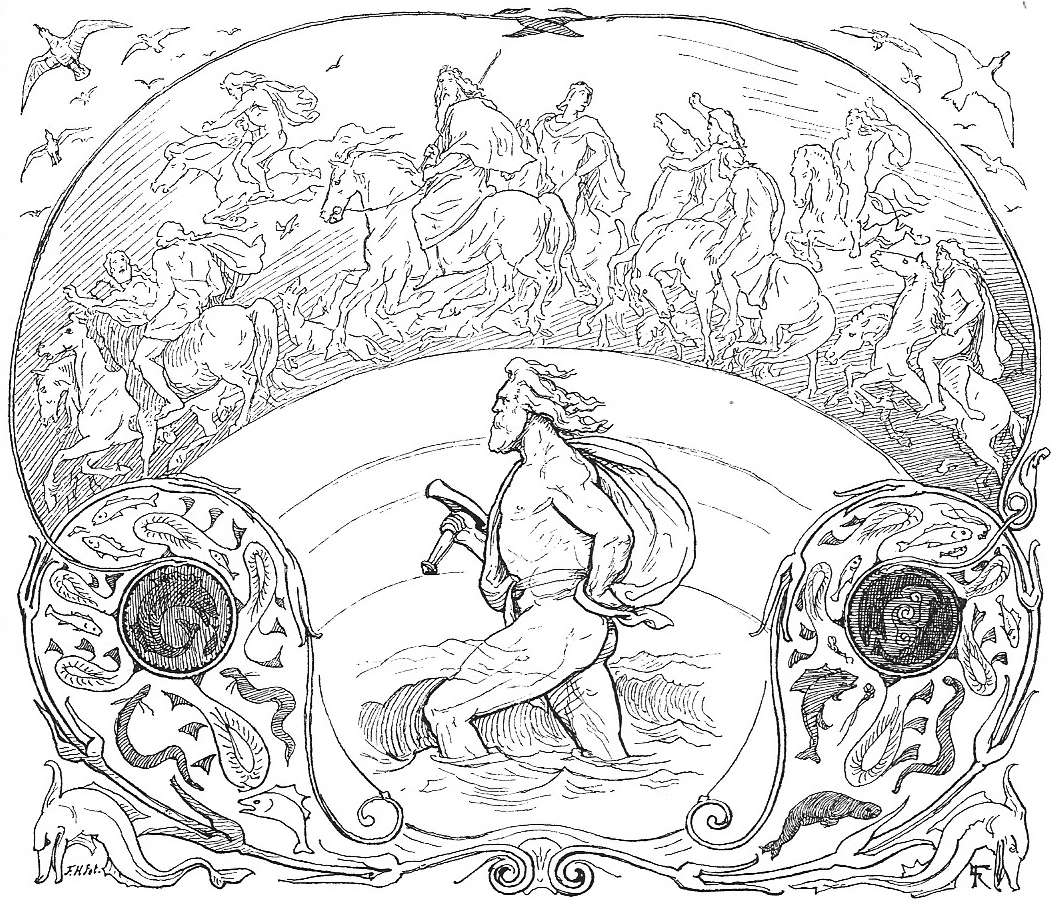
Thor wades through a river while the other Æsir ride across the bridge Bifröst (1895) by Lorenz Frølich

In Norse mythology, the Kerlaugar (plural form of Old Norse kerlaug "kettle-bath",) i.e. "bath-tub", are two rivers through which the god Thor wades. The Kerlaugar are attested in the Poetic Edda, compiled in the 13th century from earlier traditional material, and in a citation of the same verse in the Prose Edda, written in the 13th century by Snorri Sturluson.

== Attestations ==
The Kerlaugar are mentioned once in the Poetic Edda. In the Poetic Edda poem Grímnismál, Grímnir notes that the bridge Asbrú "burns all with flames" and that, every day, the god Thor wades through the waters of Körmt and Örmt and the two Kerlaugar:

Benjamin Thorpe translation: Körmt and Ormt, and the Kerlaugs twain: these Thor must wade each day, when he to council goes at Yggdrasil's ash; for as the As-bridge is all on fire, the holy waters boil.	Henry Adams Bellows translation: Kormt and Ormt and the Kerlaugs twain Shall Thor each day wade through, (When dooms to give he forth shall go To the ash-tree Yggdrasil;) For heaven's bridge burns all in flame, And the sacred waters seethe.

In the Prose Edda, the rivers are mentioned twice, once in Gylfaginning and once in Skáldskaparmál. In Gylfaginning, High says that Thor wades through rivers to go to court, and then quotes the above cited Grímnismál stanza in support. In Skáldskaparmál, the Kerlaugar appear in the list of rivers in the Nafnaþulur.

== Theories and interpretations ==
Rudolf Simek comments that the meaning is "strange" and may point to an otherwise lost myth about Thor. On the other hand Guðbrandur Vigfússon argued that it and several other river names in the same poem were Irish in origin and related it to river names beginning in Ker- or Char- such as Cherwell. He and Frederick York Powell rendered it "Charlocks" in Corpus Poeticum Boreale.

Thor frequently crosses rivers in the mythology; John Lindow suggests this is due to the large amount of time he spends in the realms of the jötnar, "who live on the other sides of boundaries", and points to a symbolic connection between jötnar and water, citing the ocean-dwelling Jörmungandr as an example.

== Sources ==
- Sturtevant, Albert Morey (1951). "Etymological Comments on Certain Words and Names in the Elder Edda". PMLA volume 66, no. 2. JSTOR 459605.
