= Noatun =

Noatun or Nóatún may refer to:

- Nóatún (mythology), abode of the god Njörðr
- Nóatún (supermarket), a chain of Icelandic supermarkets
- Noatún, a 1938 book by William Heinesen
- Noatun, a fictional place in the game Bayonetta 2
- Noatun (media player), a media player in the K Desktop Environment 2
