= Brísingamen =

Torc or necklace in Norse mythology

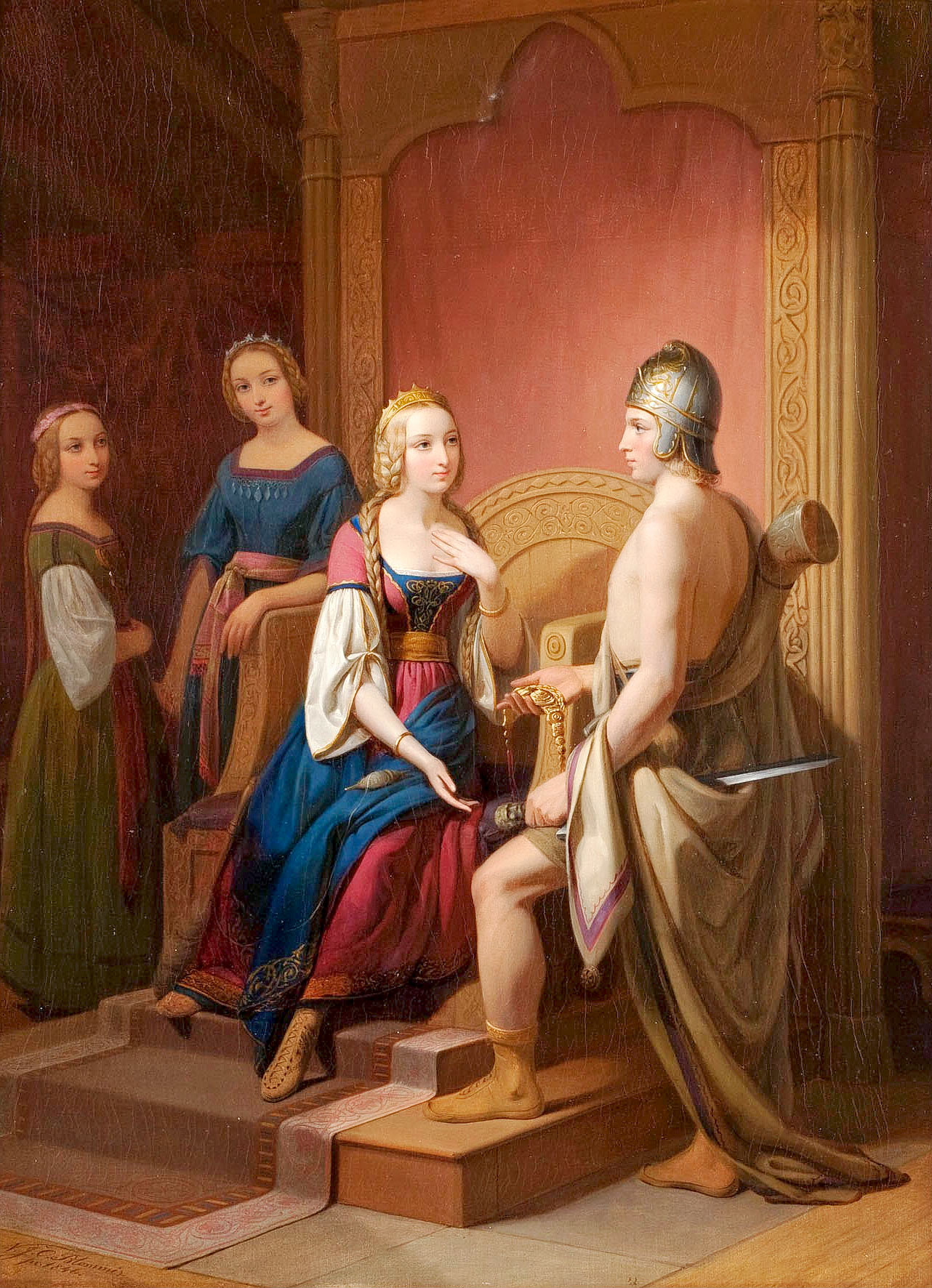
Heimdall returns Brisingamen to Freyja, painting by Nils Blommér (1846).

In Norse mythology, Brísingamen (or Brísinga men) is the torc or necklace of the goddess Freyja, of which little else is known for certain.

== Etymology ==
The name is an Old Norse compound brísinga-men whose second element is men "(ornamental) neck-ring (of precious metal), torc". (Note: German sources use Halsband lit. "neck-band", which differentiates from Halskette for 'necklace'.) (Note: Finnur Jónsson also remarked that there was "også Brisingsmykket, men det var kun om halsen (also the Brísingamen, but this was only around the neck)" besides the "jewels" on [Thor's] breast (supposedly necklace, which would have been called steinasörvi(cf. sörvi) though not explicitly stated as such.)

The etymology of the first element is uncertain. It has been derived from Old Norse brísingr, a poetic term for "fire" or "amber" mentioned in the anonymous versified word-lists (þulur) appended to many manuscripts of the Prose Edda, making Brísingamen "gleaming torc", "sunny torc", or the like. However, Brísingr can also be an ethnonym, in which case Brísinga men is "torc of the Brísings"; the Old English parallel in Beowulf supports this derivation, though who the Brísings (Old Norse Brísingar) may have been remains unknown.

== Attestations ==
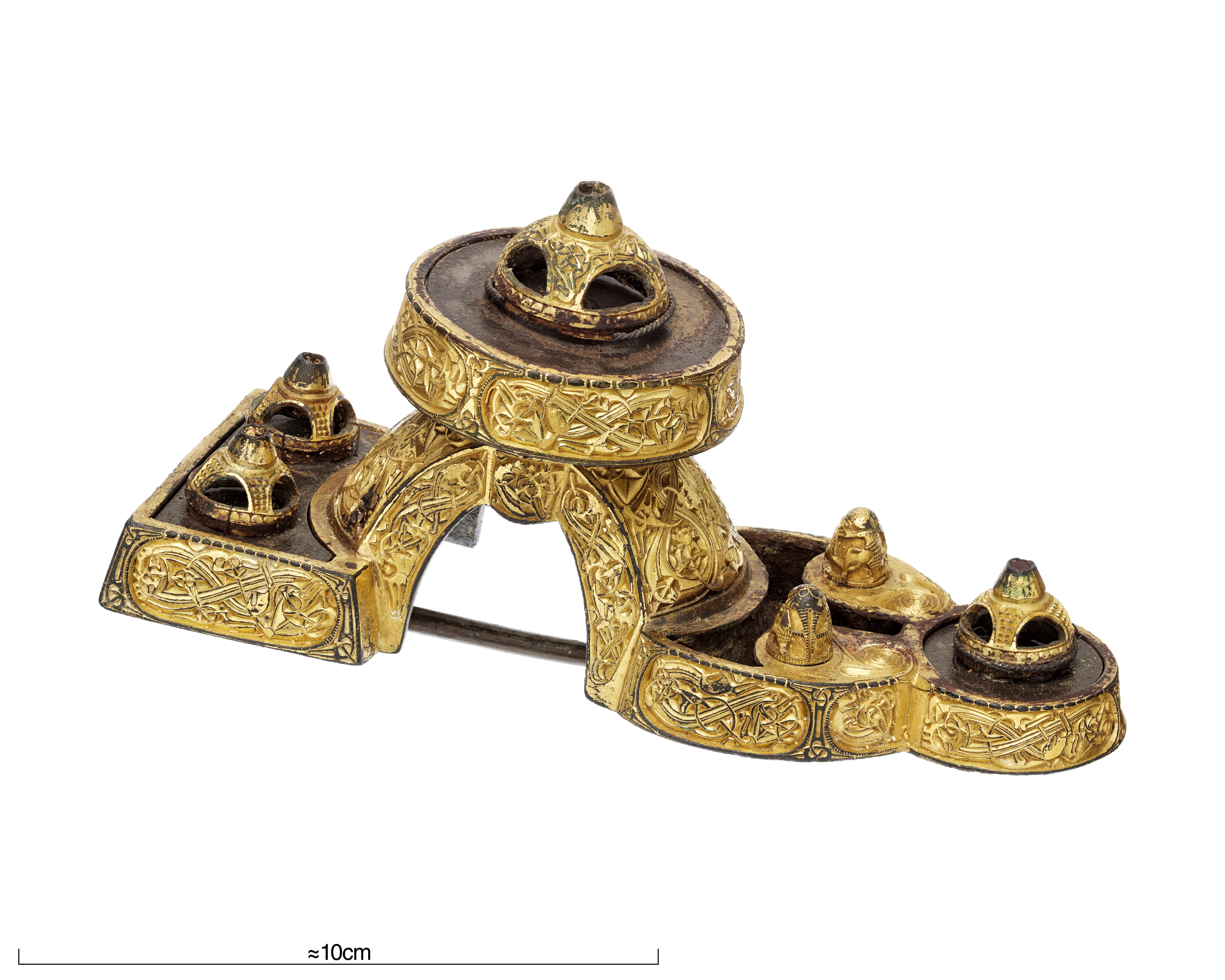
The Othemars brooch from Gotland may be a cultic object representing Brísingamen

=== Beowulf ===
An Anglo-Saxon equivalent of the Brísingamen may possibly be referred to in the Anglo-Saxon epic Beowulf as Brosinga mene. The brief mention in Beowulf is as follows (trans. by Howell Chickering, 1977):

[S]ince Hama bore off
to the shining city the Brosings' necklace,
Gem-figured filigree. He gained the hatred
Of Eormanric the Goth, chose eternal reward.

The Beowulf poet is clearly referring to the legends about Theoderic the Great. The Þiðrekssaga tells that the warrior Heime (Háma in Old English) takes sides against Ermanaric ("Eormanric"), king of the Goths, and has to flee his kingdom after robbing him; later in life, Hama enters a monastery and gives them all his stolen treasure. However, this saga makes no mention of the great necklace.

=== Poetic Edda ===
In the poem Þrymskviða of the Poetic Edda, Þrymr, the king of the jǫtnar, steals Thor's hammer, Mjölnir. Freyja lends Loki her falcon cloak to search for it; but upon returning, Loki tells Freyja that Þrymr has hidden the hammer and demanded to marry her in return. Freyja is so wrathful that all the Æsir’s halls beneath her are shaken and the necklace Brísingamen breaks off from her neck. Later, Thor borrows Brísingamen when he dresses up as Freyja to go to the wedding at Jǫtunheimr.

=== Prose Edda ===
Húsdrápa, a skaldic poem partially preserved in the Prose Edda, relates the story of the theft of Brísingamen by Loki. One day when Freyja wakes up and finds Brísingamen missing, she enlists the help of Heimdallr to help her search for it. Eventually they find the thief, who turns out to be Loki and who has transformed himself into a seal. Heimdallr turns into a seal as well and fights Loki (trans. Byock 2005):

...it was on this occasion that [Heimdall] and Loki came to blows over the ring of the Brisings. The skald Ulf Uggason devotes a lengthy passage to that story in his poem Husdrapa, and it is stated there that Heimdall and Loki took on the shape of seals.

After a lengthy battle at Singasteinn, Heimdallr wins and returns Brísingamen to Freyja.

Snorri Sturluson quoted this old poem in Skáldskaparmál, saying that because of this legend Heimdallr is called "Seeker of Freyja's Necklace" (Skáldskaparmál, section 8) and Loki is called "Thief of Brísingamen" (Skáldskaparmál, section 16). A similar story appears in the later Sörla þáttr, where Heimdallr does not appear.

=== Sörla þáttr ===
Sörla þáttr is a short story in the later and extended version of the Saga of Olaf Tryggvason in the manuscript of the Flateyjarbók, which was written and compiled by two Christian priests, Jon Thordson and Magnus Thorhalson, in the late 14th century. In the end of the story, the arrival of Christianity dissolves the old curse that traditionally was to endure until Ragnarök.

Freyja was a human in Asia and was the favorite concubine of Odin, King of Asialand. When this woman wanted to buy a golden necklace (no name given) forged by four dwarves (named Dvalinn, Alfrik, Berlingr, and Grer), she offered them gold and silver but they replied that they would only sell it to her if she would lie a night by each of them. She came home afterward with the necklace and kept silent as if nothing happened. But a man called Loki somehow knew it, and came to tell Odin. King Odin commanded Loki to steal the necklace, so Loki turned into a fly to sneak into Freyja's bower and stole it. When Freyja found her necklace missing, she came to ask king Odin. In exchange for it, Odin ordered her to make two kings, each served by twenty kings, fight forever unless some christened men so brave would dare to enter the battle and slay them. She said yes, and got that necklace back. Under the spell, king Högni and king Heðinn battled for one hundred and forty-three years, as soon as they fell down they had to stand up again and fight on. But in the end, the Christian lord Olaf Tryggvason, who has a great fate and luck, arrived with his christened men, and whoever slain by a Christian would stay dead. Thus the pagan curse was finally dissolved by the arrival of Christianity. After that, the noble man, king Olaf, went back to his realm.

The battle of Högni and Heðinn is recorded in several medieval sources, including the skaldic poem Ragnarsdrápa, Skáldskaparmál (section 49), and Gesta Danorum: king Högni's daughter, Hildr, is kidnapped by king Heðinn. When Högni comes to fight Heðinn on an island, Hildr comes to offer her father a necklace on behalf of Heðinn for peace; but the two kings still battle, and Hildr resurrects the fallen to make them fight until Ragnarök. None of these earlier sources mentions Freyja or king Olaf Tryggvason, the historical figure who Christianized Norway and Iceland in the 10th Century.

== Archaeological record ==
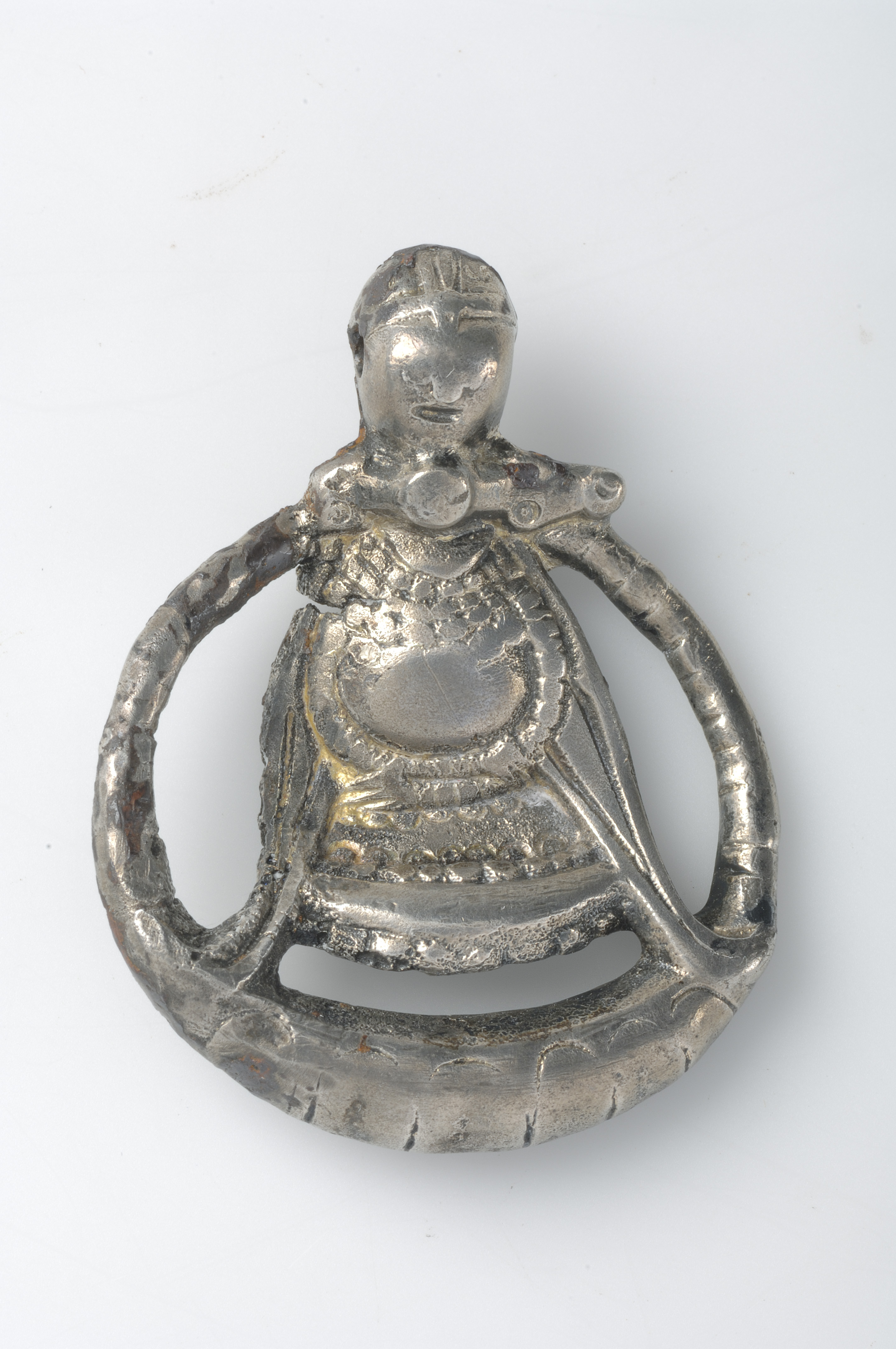
The Hagebyhöga pendant, in the Swedish Museum of National Antiquities in Stockholm

A Völva was buried c. 1000 with considerable splendour in Hagebyhöga in Östergötland, Sweden. In addition to being buried with her wand, she had received great riches which included horses, a wagon and an Arabian bronze pitcher. There was also a silver pendant, which represents a woman with a broad necklace around her neck. This kind of necklace was only worn by the most prominent women during the Iron Age and some have interpreted it as Freyja's necklace Brísingamen. The pendant may represent Freyja herself.

Several large “disc-on-bow”-type brooches from Gotland, Sweden have been identified as cultic objects possibly related to the brísingamen; among them is a particularly large brooch from the village Othemars. They are far too large and heavy to have been worn by any human woman, and are found exclusively in hoards rather than graves.

== Modern influence ==
Alan Garner wrote a children's fantasy novel called The Weirdstone of Brisingamen, published in 1960, about an enchanted teardrop bracelet.

Diana Paxson's novel Brisingamen features Freyja and her necklace.

Black Phoenix Alchemy Lab has a perfumed oil scent named Brisingamen.

Freyja's necklace Brisingamen features prominently in Betsy Tobin's novel Iceland, where the necklace is seen to have significant protective powers.

The Brisingamen feature as a major item in Joel Rosenberg's Keepers of the Hidden Ways series of books. In it, there are seven jewels that were created for the necklace by the Dwarfs and given to the Norse goddess. She in turn eventually split them up into the seven separate jewels and hid them throughout the realm, as together they hold the power to shape the universe by its holder. The book's plot is about discovering one of them and deciding what to do with the power they allow while avoiding Loki and other Norse characters.

In Christopher Paolini's The Inheritance Cycle, the word "brisingr" means fire. This is probably a distillation of the word brisinga.

Ursula Le Guin's short story Semley's Necklace, the first part of her novel Rocannon's World, is a retelling of the Brisingamen story on an alien planet.

Brisingamen is represented as a card in the Yu-Gi-Oh! Trading Card Game, "Nordic Relic Brisingamen".

Brisingamen was part of MMORPG Ragnarok Online lore, which is ranked as "God item". The game is heavily based from Norse mythology.

In the Firefly Online game, one of the planets of the Himinbjörg system (which features planets named after figures from Germanic mythology) is named Brisingamen. It is third from the star, and has moons named Freya, Beowulf, and Alberich.

The Brisingamen is an item that can be found and equipped in the video game, Castlevania: Lament of Innocence.

In the French comics Freaks' Squeele, the character of Valkyrie accesses her costume change ability by touching a decorative torc necklace affixed to her forehead, named Brizingamen.

== See also ==
- Rings in Germanic cultures
- Necklace of Harmonia, a necklace owned by the Greek goddess Harmonia, a daughter of Aphrodite
