= Körmt and Örmt =

Mythological rivers

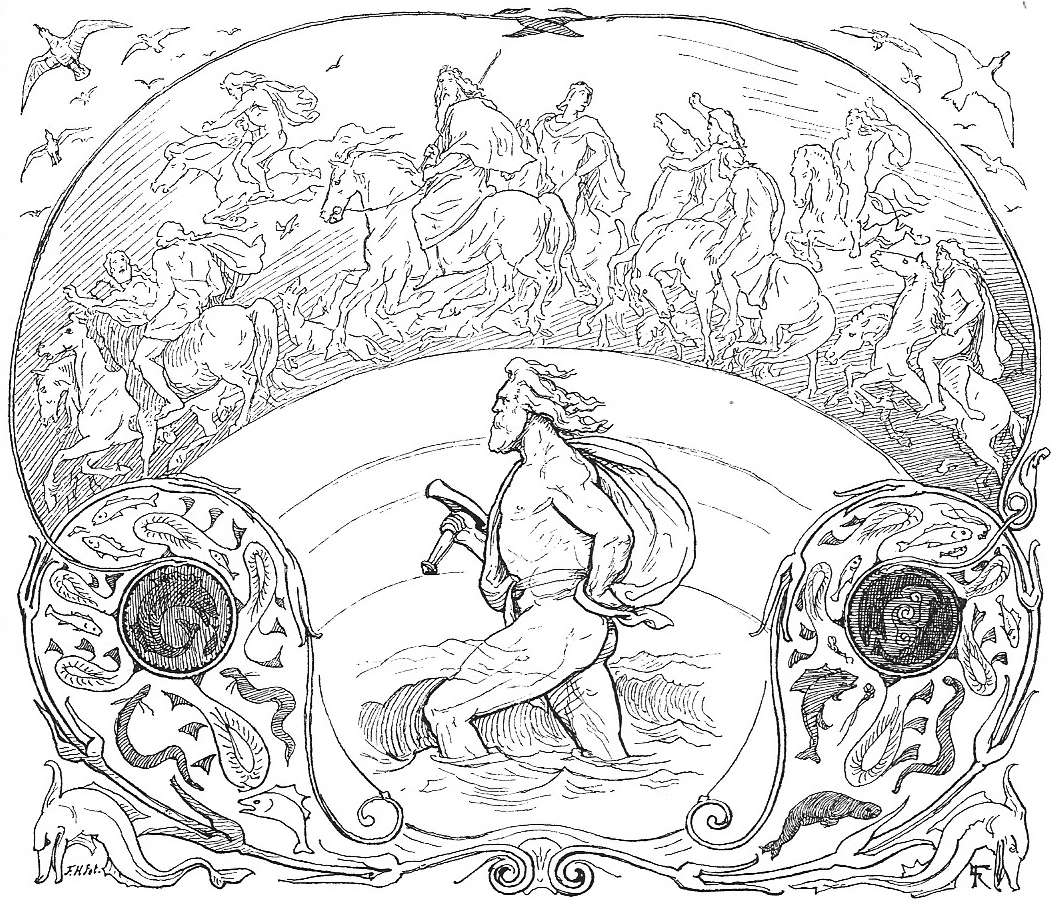
Thor wades through a river while the æsir ride across the bridge Bifröst (1895) by Lorenz Frølich

In Norse mythology, Körmt and Örmt are two rivers which Thor wades through every day when he goes to judgment by Yggdrasill. The source for this is a strophe in Grímnismál which is also quoted in the Prose Edda.
