= Hraudung =

Norse mythological figure

In Norse mythology, Hraudung was a human king and the father of Geirröd and Agnar according to the prose header of the poem Grímnismál from the Poetic Edda.

Hraudung is also listed in the Skáldskaparmál section of the Prose Edda as both a giant and the name of a sea king.
