= Úlfr Uggason =

Icelandic poet

Úlfr Uggason (Modern Icelandic: Úlfur Uggason [ˈulvʏr ˈʏkːaˌsɔːn]) was an Icelandic skald who lived in the last part of the tenth century.

The Laxdæla saga tells how he composed his Húsdrápa for a wedding. Geirmundr married Þuríðr, whose father, Óláfr pái ("peacock") Höskuldsson, had a magnificent hall built in his farm in Hjarðarholt (Iceland), with paintings representing legends on the walls and ceiling:

The wedding feast was a very crowded one, for the new hall was finished. Ulf Uggason was of the bidden guests, and he had made a poem on Olaf Hoskuldson and of the legends that were painted round the hall, and he gave it forth at the feast. This poem is called the "House Song," and is well made. Olaf rewarded him well for the poem.

—The Laxdæla saga (29), Muriel Press's translation

Three myths are described in the twelve stanzas and half-stanzas of Úlfr's Húsdrápa: Baldr's funeral, Thor fishing for Jörmungandr, the Midgard serpent, and Heimdall's fight with Loki for the Brísingamen.

Apart from this episode, little is known about Úlfr. Landnámabók gives the name and the lineage of his wife, Járngerðr. He also appears twice in the Brennu-Njáls saga. In chapter 60, on the occasion of a suit (which he loses), he is challenged to a duel by Gunnar of Hlíðarendi. In chapter 102, the skald Þorvaldr veili, who has gathered a troop to slay Þangbrandr (a missionary sent to Iceland by Óláfr Tryggvason) and his companion Guðleifr Arason, asks him to kill the priest, but Úlfr refuses to be involved. He then composes the lausavísa that is, along with Húsdrápa, all that survives of his work.
