= Signhildsberg =

Building in Upplands-Bro Municipality, Stockholm County, Sweden

Coordinates: 59°37′25″N 17°39′10″E

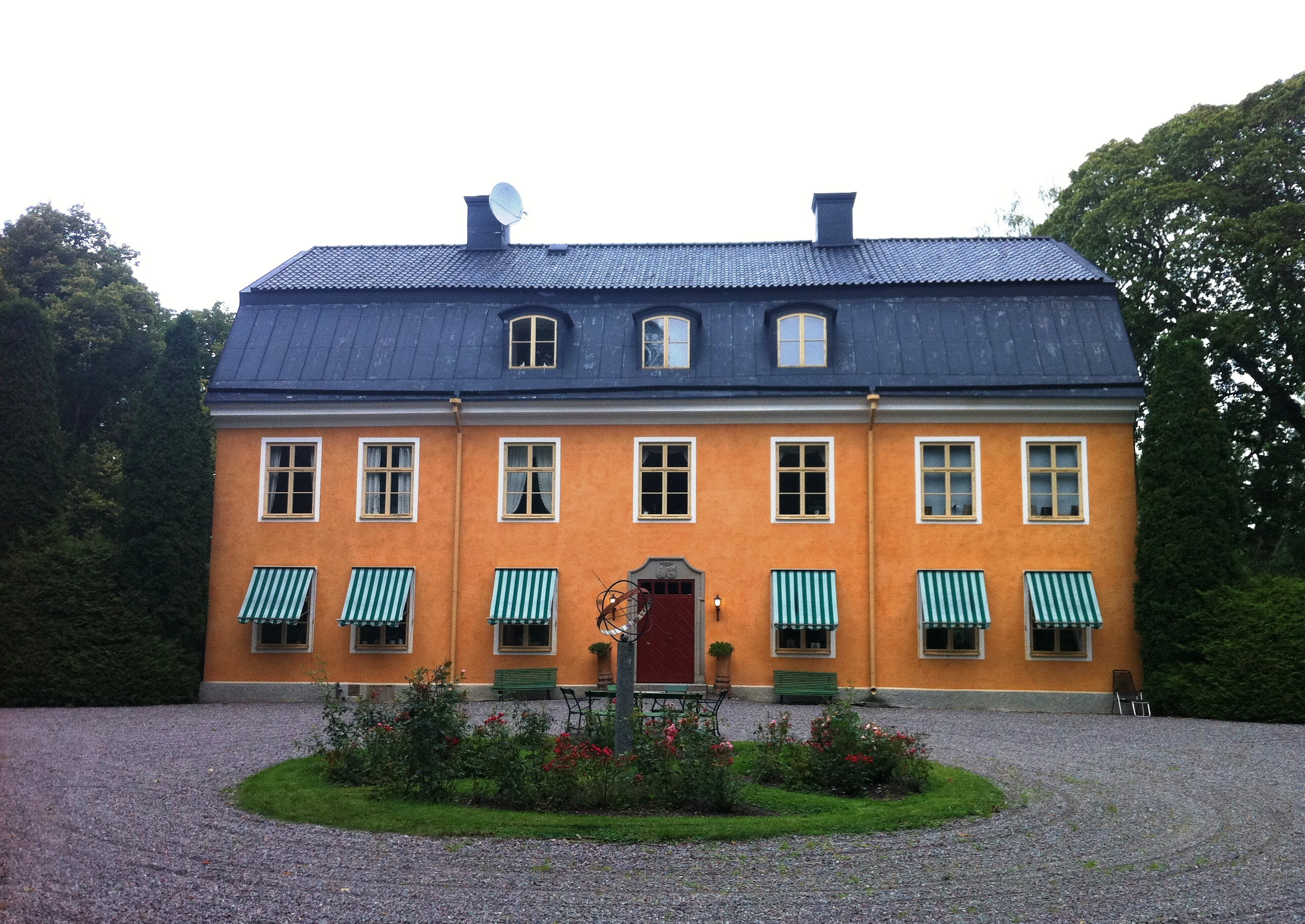
Signhildsberg, 2012.

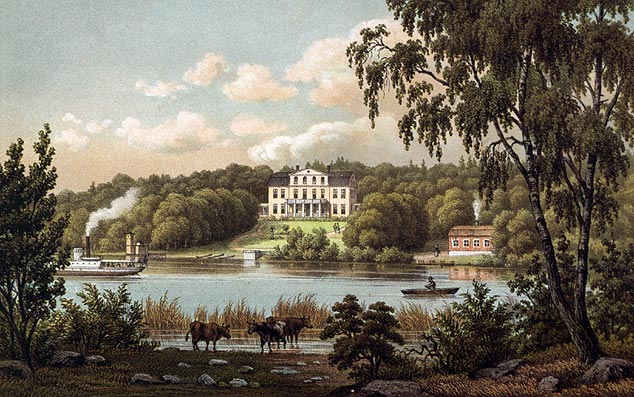
Signhildsberg 1881, lithography by Alexander Nay.

Signhildsberg (historically Fornsigtuna, where forn means ancient, Old Sigtuna, Sithun, Signesberg) is a manor that formerly was a royal estate (Uppsala öd), located in the parish of Håtuna approximately 4 kilometres (2.5 mi) west of the modern town of Sigtuna, by Lake Mälaren in Sweden. Although the location is nearly forgotten, it has a central role in Norse mythology, according to which it was founded by the Norse god Odin.

== Etymology ==
The etymology of the name Sigtuna is contested. According to one theory, it is a compound name where the second element is -tuna and the first one is either of two closely related dialectal words, viz. sig meaning "seeping water" or "swamp" or sik meaning "swamp". As a basis for this intpretation, a brook south of Signhildsberg has been mentioned, or the fact that the estate was surrounded by marshy terrain.

Another theory considers the name to be an ancient prestigious "wander toponym", meaning "strong fortress", like the Celtic toponym Segodunum, from Proto-Germanic *sigatūna-, Old Norse Sigtún, cf. Proto-Germanic *segaz ~ *sigiz- "victory": Gothic sigis, Old Norse sigr, Old English sigor, Old Frisian sige, sīge, Old High German sigi, sigu.

In 1680, the name was changed to Signhildsberg after the Old Norse legend of Hagbard and Signy.

== Heimskringla ==
In Chapter 5 of the Ynglinga saga section of his Heimskringla, Snorri Sturluson relates that Odin and the Æsir first arrived at Old Sigtuna when they came to Sweden:

Odin took up his residence at the Maelare lake, at the place now called Old Sigtun. There he erected a large temple, where there were sacrifices according to the customs of the Asaland people. He appropriated to himself the whole of that district, and called it Sigtun. To the temple priests he gave also domains. Njord dwelt in Noatun, Freyr in Upsala, Heimdal in the Himinbergs, Thor in Thrudvang, Balder in Breidablik; to all of them he gave good estates.

Later the pirate Sölve arrived at Old Sigtuna to claim the Swedish throne:

Solve came unexpectedly in the night on Eystein (Östen), surrounded the house in which the king was, and burned him and all his court. Then Solve went to Sigtun, and desired that the Swedes should receive him, and give him the title of king; but they collected an army, and tried to defend the country against him, on which there was a great battle, that lasted, according to report, eleven days. There King Solve was victorious, and was afterwards king of the Swedish dominions for a long time, until at last the Swedes betrayed him, and he was killed.

In the part called The Saga of St. Olaf, the Norwegian king Olaf Haraldsson makes shore at Old Sigtuna:

King Olaf steered thereafter eastwards to Svithjod, and into the Lag (the Mælar lake), and ravaged the land on both sides. He sailed all the way up to Sigtuna, and laid his ships close to the old Sigtuna. The Swedes say the stone-heaps are still to be seen which Olaf had laid under the ends of the gangways from the shore to the ships.

== Skaldic poetry ==
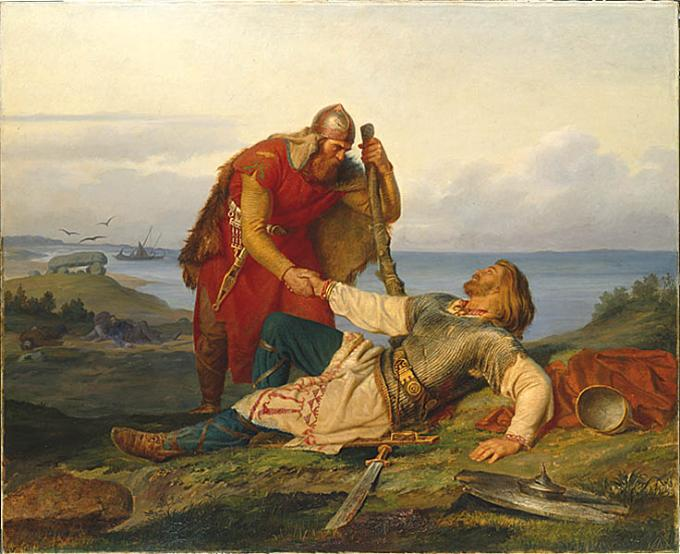
Hjalmar dying, painting by Mårten Eskil Winge (1866).

In Orvar-Odd's saga, Hjalmar laments his dying:

Sék hvar sitja
Sigtúnum á
fljóð þaus löttu
farar mik þaðan;
gleðrat Hjálmar
í höll konungs
öl né rekkar
of aldr síðan.

I see where they sit
at home in Sigtun,
the girls who begged
me not to go;
no joy for Hjalmar
in the hall after this,
with ale and men,
ever again.

The location is also mentioned in other poems by the 11th-century skalds Þjóðólfr Arnórsson Valgarðr á Velli and Arnórr Þórðarson.

== Gesta Danorum ==
Saxo Grammaticus writes in Book 8 of Gesta Danorum that Sigmund, one of the warriors of the House of Yngling, came from what is chronologically Old Sigtuna to fight at the Battle of Bråvalla:

They likewise held the god Frey to be the founder of their race. Amongst these from the town of Sigtun also came Sigmund, a champion advocate, versed in making contracts of sale and purchase; besides him Frosti surnamed Bowl: allied with him was Alf the Lofty (Proud?) from the district of Upsala; this man was a swift spear-thrower, and used to go in the front of the battle.

== Archaeology ==
There are two large ruins that had been two large three-aisled halls, a series of terraces just above the shore-line of the Germanic Iron Age, traces of a harbour, a large mound and a number of smaller grave fields. Excavations have dated the remains to the Vendel Age, part of the Germanic Iron Age, and the Viking Age, i.e., from the 6th century until the 11th century.

== History ==
It was an Iron Age and mediaeval royal estate (see Uppsala öd) and it was located strategically at the waterway to Old Uppsala. In the 10th century, the name was transferred to modern Sigtuna, which apparently assumed many of its functions.

- It is mentioned in the 1170s when Pope Alexander III addresses king Knut Eriksson and Jarl Birger Brosa (Svenskt Diplomatarium I nr 852. Originalbrev). The pope demands that they return to the archbishop of Uppsala (until 1270 the name referred to Gamla Uppsala) the villages Strom (Ström in the parish of Norrsunda), Fornesitune and Guazbro (probably Vadsbro). The villages had earlier belonged to the bishop of Sigtuna, but they had been confiscated by the crown when the bishopric had been moved to Gamla Uppsala.
- In 1299, Birger Magnusson, the son of Magnus Ladulås, spent some time in Old Sigtuna as one of his letters was written in Sightonia Antiqua (in Malmberg, Ernst: Svenska slott och herresäten) or apud antiquam Sightoniam The difference seems to be a matter of presenting the name in the nominal case or preserving the case in which the name appeared in the original text.
- In 1315, according to Svenskt Diplomatarium (SD) III nr 2032 (s.228), Duke Erik Magnusson was bestowed a part of Old Sigtuna, which is called Siktonia vetus (vetus being Latin for "old"). Neighbouring properties are also named: Norgungi (Norränge in Håtuna) and Frötunum (Frötuna in Håbo-Tibble)
- In 1541, according to Kammar-ark.: jordeböcker, Uppland 1541 nr 5, the location is named as one of Gustav I Vasa's estates and spelled Forsictuna, Foorsictuna and Fforssiiktwna (in Malmberg, Ernst: Svenska slott och herresäten).
- In 1542, according to Gustav Vasas jordebok are mentioned Foorsictuna and Norringe (Norränge)
- In 1551, according to Sven Nielssons jordebok för Stäkets län, it is mentioned as the royal estate of Forsictuna (Malmberg, Ernst: Svenska slott och herresäten and Friesen: Om staden Sigtunas ålder).
- In 1567, it is mentioned as Foder Sictuna in the province of Uppland
- In the 17th century, the name Försigtuna is used on a map (Lantmät.verk. Gävle).

Since the 17th century, the location has been a manor named Signhildsberg or Signesberg.

== Other Sources ==
Nationalencyklopedin and A historical review of the name, from which the information about the name and dates is taken.

== Related reading ==
- Jonas Ros: Sigtuna och folklanden : den tidiga Sigtunamyntningen och den politiska (Fornvännen 2002(97):3, s. [161]-175)
