= Húsdrápa =

Late 10th-century poem by Úlfr Uggason

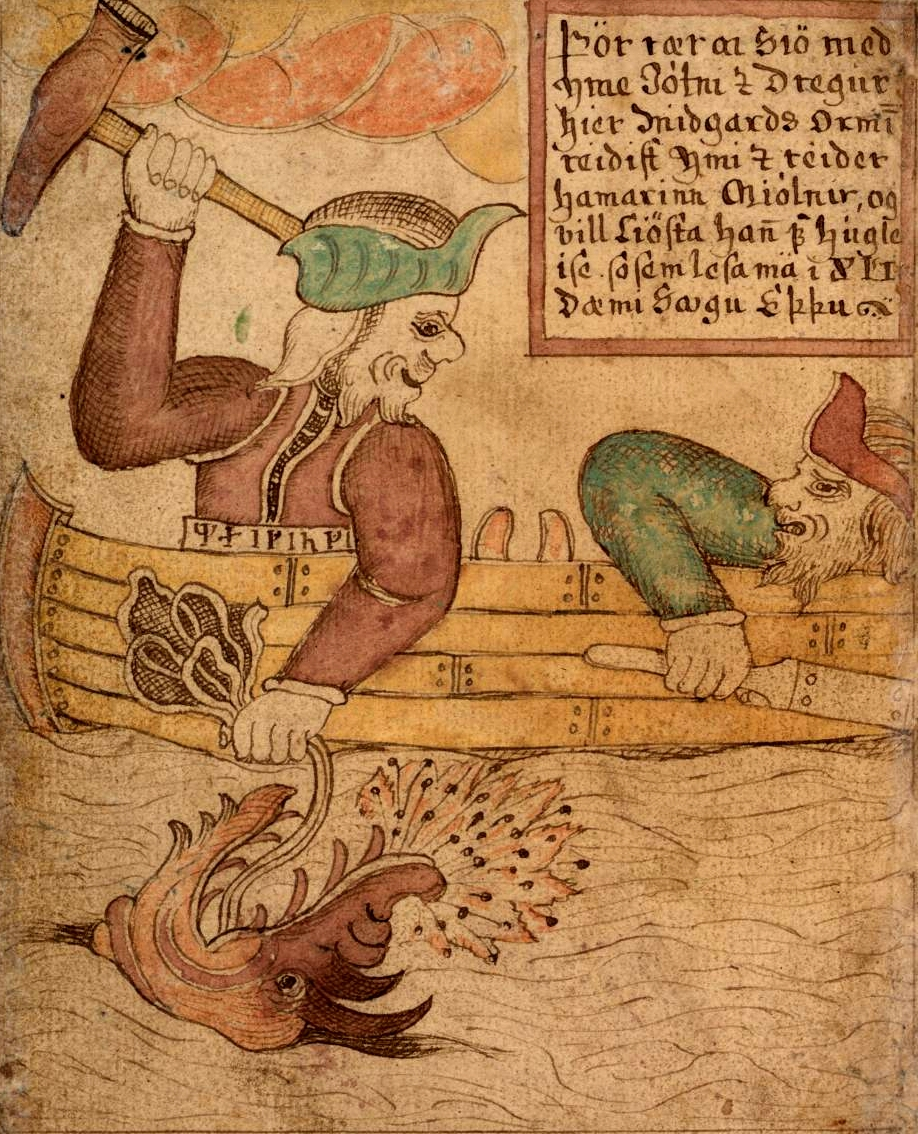
Thor goes fishing for Jörmungandr in this picture from an 18th-century Icelandic manuscript.

Húsdrápa (Old Norse: 'House-Lay') is a skaldic poem partially preserved in the Prose Edda where disjoint stanzas of it are quoted. It is attributed to the skald Úlfr Uggason. The poem describes mythological scenes carved on kitchen panels. In the stanzas that have come down to us three such scenes are described.

- Thor's fishing trip.
- Baldr's funeral.
- An obscure myth understood by Snorri Sturluson to deal with a competition between Loki and Heimdallr for Brísingamen.

Húsdrápa is often compared with Haustlöng and Ragnarsdrápa which also describe artworks depicting mythological scenes.

The poem is mentioned in Laxdæla saga:

"The wedding feast was a very crowded one, for the new hall was finished. Ulf Uggason was of the bidden guests, and he had made a poem on Olaf Hoskuldson and of the legends that were painted round the hall, and he gave it forth at the feast. This poem is called the House Song, and is well made. Olaf rewarded him well for the poem."

== See also ==
- Ekphrasis
