= Breidablik =

Home of Baldr in Nordic mythology

Breiðablik (sometimes anglicised as Breithablik or Breidablik) is the home of Baldr in Nordic mythology.

== Meaning ==
The word Breiðablik has been variously translated as 'broad sheen', 'Broad gleam', 'Broad-gleaming' or 'the far-shining one',

== Attestations ==
=== Grímismál ===
The Eddic poem Grímnismál describes Breiðablik as the fair home of Baldr:

Old Norse text	Bellows translation
Breiðablik eru in sjaundu, en þar Baldr hefir sér of gerva sali, á því landi, er ek liggja veit fæsta feiknstafi.	The seventh is Breithablik; Baldr has there For himself a dwelling set, In the land I know that lies so fair, And from evil fate is free.

=== Gylfaginning ===
In Snorri Sturluson's Gylfaginning, Breiðablik is described in a list of places in heaven, identified by some scholars as Asgard:

Old Norse text

Þar er einn sá staðr, er Breiðablik er kallaðr, ok engi er þar fegri staðr.

Brodeur translation

Then there is also in that place the abode called Breidablik, and there is not in heaven a fairer dwelling.

Later in the work, when Snorri describes Baldr, he gives another description, citing Grímnismál, though he does not name the poem:

Old Norse text

Hann býr þar, sem heitir Breiðablik. Þat er á himni. Í þeim stað má ekki vera óhreint...

Brodeur translation

He [Baldr] dwells in the place called Breidablik, which is in heaven; in that place may nothing unclean be...

== Interpretation and discussion ==
The name of Breiðablik has been noted to link with Baldr's attributes of light and beauty.

Similarities have been drawn between the description of Breiðablik in Grímnismál and Heorot in Beowulf, which are both free of 'baleful runes' (Old Norse: feicnstafi and Old English: fācenstafas respectively). In Beowulf, the lack of fācenstafas refers to the absence of crimes being committed, and therefore both halls have been proposed to be sanctuaries.

== In popular culture ==
- Breidablik is a sacred weapon in Fire Emblem Heroes that the Summoner uses to summon Heroes coming from different Fire Emblem games.
- In the PlayStation game Xenogears, Bledavik is the name of the capital city of the desert kingdom of Aveh on the Ignas continent.
- Breiðablik is also the name of an Icelandic multi-sports club from Kópavogur, who has won among others three Besta deild karla titles in men's football.

== See also ==
- Álfheimr, the home of Freyr
- Nóatún, the home of Njörðr
- Þrúðvangr, the home of Thor

== Bibliography ==
=== Primary ===
- Bellows, Henry Adam (2004). The poetic Edda : the mythological poems. Mineola, NY: Dover Publications. ISBN 9780486437101.
- Orchard, Andy (2011). The Elder Edda : a book of Viking lore. London: Penguin Books. ISBN 9780141393728.
- Sturluson, Snorri (2018). The Prose Edda. Translated by Brodeur, Arthur Gilchrist. Franklin Classics Trade Press. ISBN 9780344335013.
- "Grímnismál (Old Norse)". heimskringla.com.
- "Gylfaginning (Old Norse)". heimskringla.no.

=== Secondary ===
- Liberman, Anatoly; Lindow, John (2004). "Some Controversial Aspects of the Baldr Myth" (PDF). Alvíssmál. 11: 17–54.
- Branston, Brian (1980). Gods of the North. London: Thames and Hudson.
- Simek, Rudolf (2008). A Dictionary of Northern Mythology. Translated by Hall, Angela. BOYE6. ISBN 9780859915137.
