= Agnarr Geirröðsson =

Norse mythical character

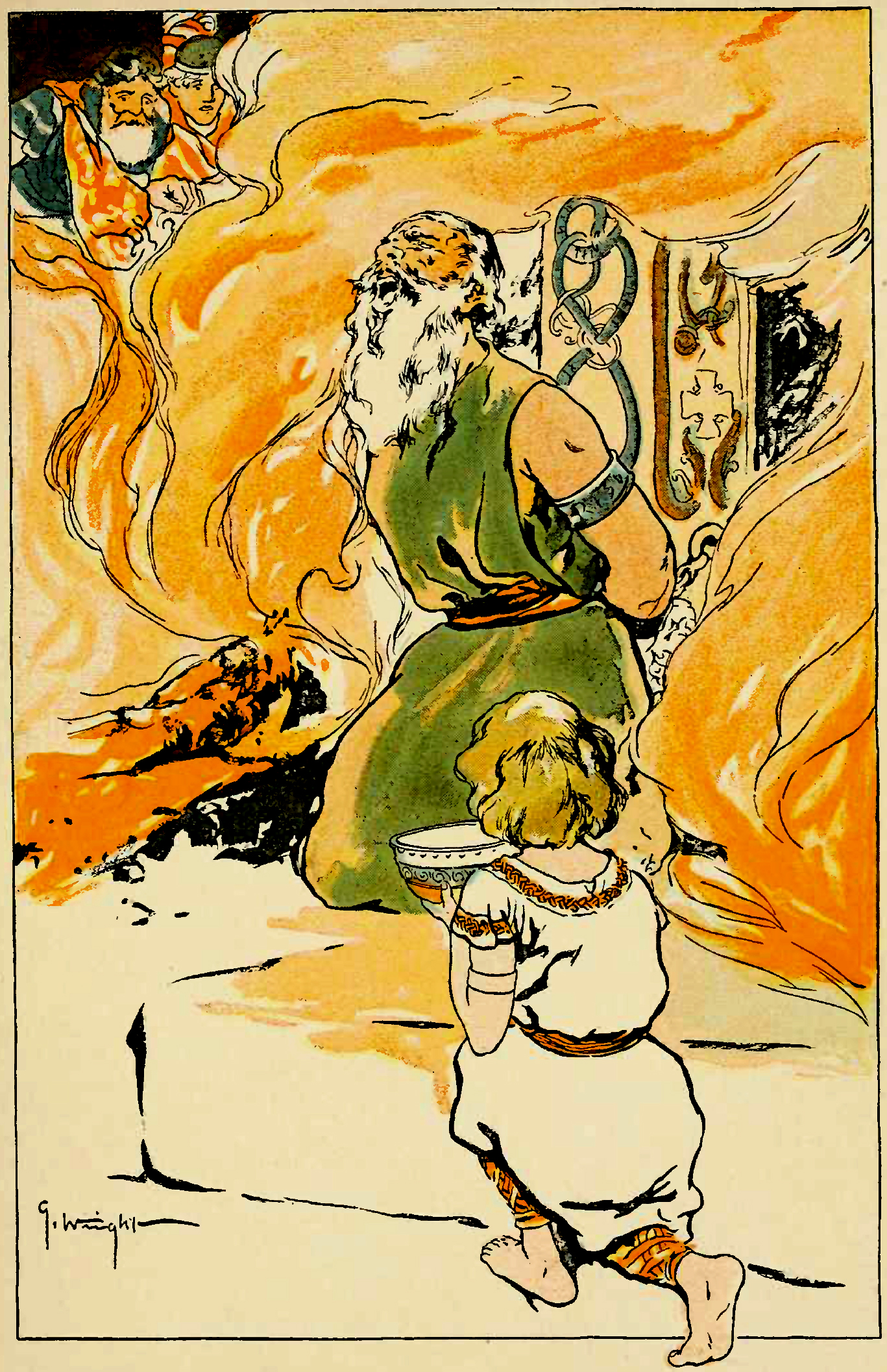
"No one gave him a thought of pity save little Agnar" (1908) by George Wright. Agnarr offering Grímnir something to drink.

Agnarr (Old Norse: [ˈɑɣnɑrː]) is the son of King Gerriod, son of Hraudung in Norse mythology. He was named after his uncle Agnarr, who was betrayed by Gerriod and sent to die on the high seas. Agnarr is solely attested in the poem Grímnismál in the Poetic Edda, the latter compiled in the 13th century from earlier traditional sources. In Grímnismál he is described as aiding Odin, disguised as Grímnir, to escape from Geirröðr's torture. After Odin reveals his true identity, King Gerriod dies by falling on his own sword, leaving Agnarr as his heir.
