= Nóatún (mythology) =

Mythological place

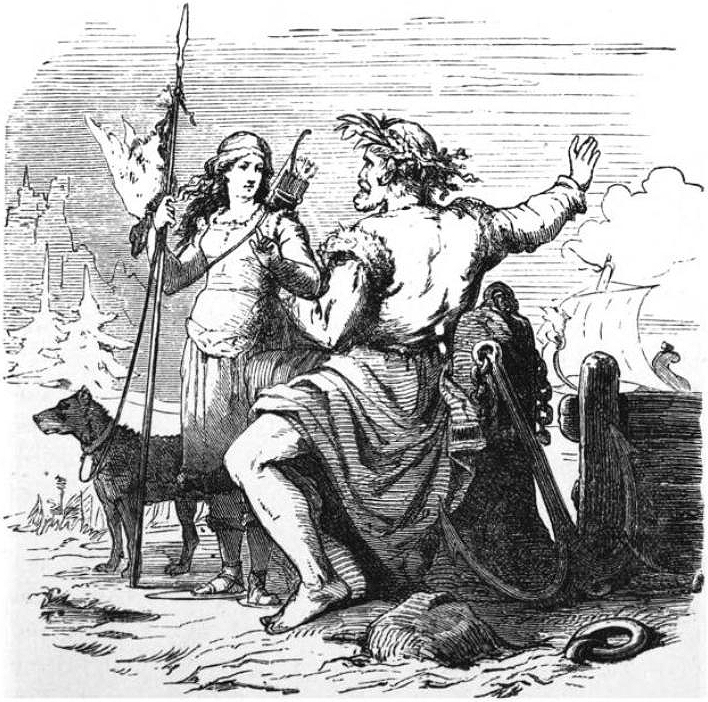
Njörðr and Skaði on the way to Nóatún by Friedrich Wilhelm Heine (1882)

In Norse mythology, Nóatún (Old Norse 'ship-enclosure') is the home of the god Njörðr, described in the Prose Edda book Gylfaginning as located "in heaven".
