= Grímnismál =

Poem from the Poetic Edda

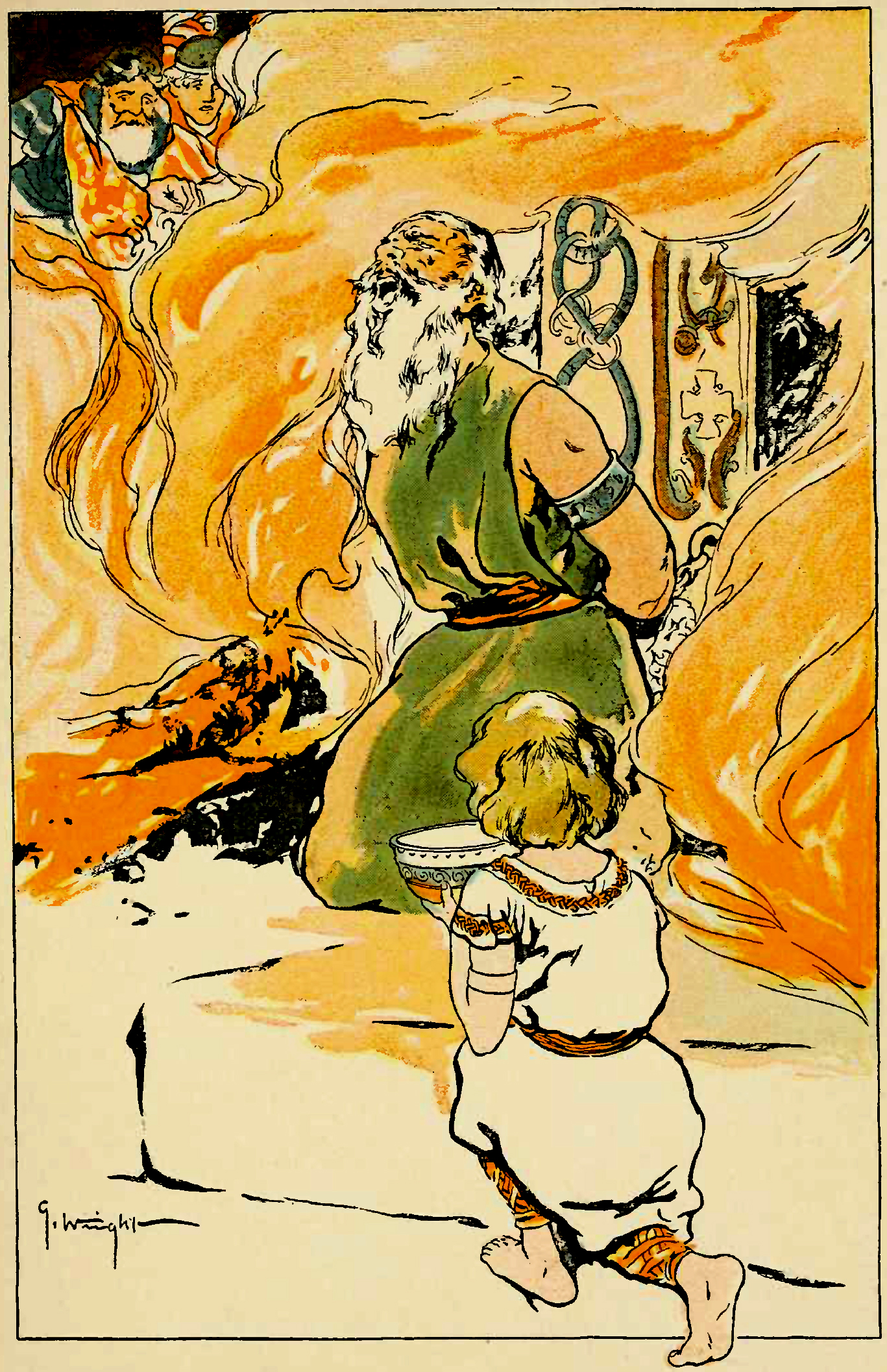
"No one gave him a thought of pity save little Agnar" by George Wright. The younger Agnarr offering the tortured Grímnir something to drink.

Grímnismál (Old Norse: [ˈɡriːmnesˌmɔːl]; 'The Speech of Grímnir') is one of the mythological poems of the Poetic Edda. It is preserved in the Codex Regius manuscript and the AM 748 I 4to fragment. It is spoken through the voice of Grímnir, one of the many guises of the god Odin. The very name suggests guise, or mask or hood. Through an error, King Geirröth tortured Odin-as-Grímnir, a fatal mistake, since Odin caused him to fall upon his own sword. The poem is written mostly in the ljóðaháttr metre, typical for wisdom verse.

== Structure and history ==
The work starts out with a lengthy prose section describing the circumstances leading up to Grímnir's monologue. The monologue itself comprises 54 stanzas of poetic verse describing the worlds and Odin's many guises. The third and last part of the poem is also prose, a brief description of Geirröth's demise, his son's ascension, and Odin's disappearance.

The prose sections were most likely not part of the original oral versions of Grímnismál. Henry Adams Bellows suggests that they were added in the 12th or 13th century and based on some sort of narrative tradition regarding the poem. This is not entirely certain. The poem itself was likely composed in the first half of the 10th century.

== Synopsis ==
Odin and his wife, Frigg, were sitting in Hlidskjalf, looking out on the worlds. They turned their eyes towards King Geirröth, who was reigning in the stead of his late father, King Hrauthung. Geirröth and his older brother Agnarr had been raised by Odin and Frigg, respectively. The god and goddess had disguised themselves as a peasant and his wife, and had taught the children wisdom. Geirröth returned to his father's kingdom where he became king upon his father's death, while Agnarr dwelt with a giantess in a cave.

In Hliðskjálf, Odin remarked to Frigg that his foster-child Geirröth seemed to be prospering more so than her Agnarr. Frigg retorted that Geirröth was so parsimonious and inhospitable that he would torture his guests if he thought there were too many of them. Odin disputed this, and the couple entered into a wager in this respect. Frigg then sent her maid Fulla to Geirröth, advising him that a magician would soon enter his court to bewitch him, and saying that he could be recognised by the fact that no dog was fierce enough to attack him.

Geirröth heeded Fulla's false warning. He ordered his men to capture the man the dogs wouldn't attack, which they did. Odin-as-Grímnir, dressed in a dark blue cloak, allowed himself to be captured. He stated that his name was Grímnir, but he would say nothing further of himself.

Geirröth then had him tortured to force him to speak, putting him between two fires for eight nights. After this time, Geirröth's son, named Agnarr after the king's brother, came to Grímnir and gave him a full horn from which to drink, saying that his father, the king, was not right to torture him.

Grímnir then spoke, saying that he had suffered eight days and nights, without succour from any save Agnarr, Geirröth's son, whom Grímnir prophesied would be Lord of the Goths. He then revealed himself for who he was, as the Highest One, promising Agnarr reward for the drink which he brought him.

Shifting from prose to poetry for Odin-as-Grímnir's monologue, Grímnir describes at great length the cosmogony of the worlds, the dwelling places of its inhabitants, and himself and his many guises.

Eventually, Grímnir turns to Geirröth and promises him misfortune, revealing his true identity. Geirröth then realized the magnitude of his mistake. Having learned that he is undone, he rose quickly to pull Odin from the fires, but the sword which he had lain upon his knee slipped and fell hilt down, so that when the king stumbled he impaled himself upon it. Odin then vanished, and Agnarr, son of the dead King Geirröth, ruled in his father's stead.

== In popular culture ==
The 12th album of the comic Valhalla is loosely based on the poem.

In the 2017 Starz television adaptation of Neil Gaiman's American Gods, the character Mad Sweeney refers to Mr. Wednesday as Grimnir. Mr. Wednesday later emulates Odin's reveal of his identity through his various names when revealing his own true nature.
