= Egil =

Egil or Egill is a masculine given name derived from Old Norse. It may refer to:

== Characters ==
- Egill (Hymiskviða), farmer in the poem Hymiskvida
- Egil, brother of Volund, hero of Völundarkviða and the Thidreks saga
- Egil One-Hand, hero from the Icelandic saga Egils saga einhenda ok Ásmundar berserkjabana
- Ongentheow, also known as Egil

== Places ==
- Eğil, a district of Diyarbakır Province, south eastern Turkey
- Egil Peak, Sverdrup Mountains, Antarctica

== Other uses ==
- Egil (given name)
- Electrical Generation and Integrated Lighting Systems Engineer, NASA flight controller

== See also ==
- Eigil
- Alt for Egil, a 2004 Norwegian musical film directed by Tore Rygh, starring Kristoffer Joner and Trond Høvik
- Egil's Saga, 13th century Icelandic saga
- Egill Skallagrímsson Brewery, an Icelandic brewery and beverage company based in Reykjavík and founded on April 17, 1913
