= Egil (given name) =

Egil or Egill is a masculine given name derived from Old Norse. It may refer to:

== People ==
=== Various ===
- Ongentheow (died 515), legendary Swedish king

=== Egil ===
- Egil, brother of Volund, legendary archer of Germanic mythology
- Egil, leader of Mechonis and antagonist in Xenoblade Chronicles
- Egil (Hymiskvida), a character in the poem Hymiskvida
- Egil One-Hand, Viking Berserker from Egils saga einhenda ok Ásmundar berserkjabana
- Egil of Fulda (died 822), abbot and hagiographer, wrote the Vita Sturmi
- Egil Aarvik (1912–1990), Norwegian politician
- Egil Bjerklund (1933–2022), Norwegian ice hockey player
- Egil Eide (1868–1946), Norwegian actor and film director
- Egil Werner Erichsen (1901–2000), Norwegian corporate director and politician
- Egil Eriksen (1909–1996), Norwegian educator and politician for the Labour Party
- Egil Fjetland (born 1962), Norwegian footballer
- Egil Gjelland (born 1973), former Norwegian biathlete
- Egil Halmøy (1901–1984), Norwegian politician for the Liberal Party
- Egil Harder (1917–1997), Danish composer
- Egil Hegerberg (born 1970), Norwegian comedian and musician
- Egil Helle (1923–2006), Norwegian newspaper editor, information worker and biographer
- Egil Hestnes (born 1943), Norwegian politician
- Egil Hjorth-Jenssen (1893–1969), Norwegian actor and theatre director
- Egil Hylleraas (1898–1965), Norwegian theoretical physicist
- Egil Jacobsen (1897–1923), Danish chess master
- Egil Remi Jensen (born 1929), Norwegian newspaper editor
- Egil Johansen (musician) (1934–1998), known as Egil "Bop" Johansen, Norwegian-Swedish jazz drummer
- Egil Johansen (footballer) (born 1962), Norwegian footballer
- Egil Johansen (orienteer) (born 1954), Norwegian orienteer
- Egil Kapstad (1940–2017), Norwegian Jazz pianist, composer and arranger
- Egil Kjølner (1920–2010), Norwegian politician for the Christian Democratic Party
- Egil Kraggerud (born 1939), Norwegian philologist
- Egil Krogh (1939–2020), American lawyer
- Egil Lærum (1921–1954), Norwegian footballer, ski jumper and athlete
- Egil Oddvar Larsen (1923–2009), Norwegian politician
- Egil Ly (born 1938), Norwegian sailor
- Egil Nyhus (born 1962), Norwegian illustrator
- Egil Offenberg (1899–1975), Norwegian businessperson and politician
- Egil Olbjørn (1902–1982), Norwegian police leader
- Egil Olsen (born 1942), Norwegian football manager and footballer
- Egil Østenstad (born 1972), football player
- Egil Reichborn-Kjennerud (1903–1974), Norwegian judge, cyclist and sports administrator
- Egil Reksten (1917–2009), Norwegian engineer and resistance member during World War II
- Egil Selvik (born 1997), Norwegian footballer
- Egil Søby (born 1945), Norwegian sprint canoer
- Egil Solsvik (1916–2005), Norwegian wrestler
- Egill Skallagrímsson, the protagonist of Egil's Saga - see Egill Skallagrimsson
- Egil Sundar (1932–1994), Norwegian journalist and newspaper editor
- Egil Svartdahl (born 1954), Norwegian TV-pastor
- Egil Taule (born 1934), Norwegian businessperson
- Egil Toreng (1922–2015), Norwegian newspaper editor and politician
- Egil Törnqvist (1932–2015), Professor of Scandinavian Studies at the University of Amsterdam and an academic literary critic
- Egil Tynæs (1941–2004), Norwegian doctor
- Egil A. Wyller (1925–2021), Norwegian philosopher, historian, non-fiction writer and translator

=== Egill ===
- Egill Örn Egilsson (born 1966), also known as Eagle Egilsson, Icelandic director and cinematographer
- Egill Einarsson or Gillz (born 1980), Icelandic private fitness coach, author and musician
- Egill Knutzen (1914–1990), Norwegian fencer. He competed at the 1936, 1948 and 1952 Summer Olympics
- Egill Skallagrímsson (910–990), famous Viking, community, leader, and Icelandic settler
- Egill Reimers (1878–1946), Norwegian architect and sailor who competed in the 1920 Summer Olympics

=== Middle name ===
- Tor Egil Kreken (born 1977), Norwegian musician
- Jan Egil Storholt (born 1949), former Norwegian speed skater

== See also ==
- Egils (given name)
