= Eigil (given name) =

Eigil is a given name. Notable people with the given name include:

- Eigil Axgil (1922–1995), Danish gay activist
- Eigil Bryld (born 1971), Danish cinematographer
- Eigil Christiansen (1894–1943), Norwegian sailor
- Eigil Friis-Christensen (1944–2018), Danish geophysicist
- Eigil of Fulda (c. 750–822), Abbot of Fulda
- Eigil Gullvåg (1921–1991), Norwegian newspaper editor and politician
- Eigil Hansen (1922–1991), Danish field hockey player
- Eigil Helland-Hansen (1910–1997), Norwegian travel agent
- Eigil Johansen (1915–?), Danish wrestler
- Eigil Knuth (1903–1996), Danish explorer, archaeologist, sculptor and writer
- Eigil Knutsen (born 1988), Norwegian politician
- Eigil Olaf Liane (1916–1994), Norwegian politician
- Eigil Misser (1934–2021), Danish footballer
- Eigil Nansen (1931–2017), Norwegian human rights activist
- Eigil Nielsen (footballer, born 1918) (1918–2000), Danish footballer
- Eigil Nielsen (footballer, born 1948) (1948–2019), Danish footballer
- Eigil Nielsen (paleontologist) (1910–1968), Danish paleontologist
- Eigil Pedersen (1917–1994), Danish chess player
- Eigil of Prüm (died 870), Abbot of Prüm
- Eigil Ramsfjell (born 1955), Norwegian curler
- Eigil Reimers (1904–1976), Danish actor
- Eigil Schwab (1882–1952), Swedish painter
- Eigil Sørensen (born 1948), Danish cyclist

== See also ==
- Eigil (disambiguation)
