= Egils (given name) =

Male given name

- Gender: Male
- Name day: 13 April

Origin
- Region of origin: Latvia

Other names
- Related names: Egil

Egils, or Egīls, is a Latvian masculine given name and may refer to:

- Egils Bojārs (born 1968), Latvian bobsledder
- Egils Helmanis (born 1971), Latvian politician and close combat instructor
- Egils Levits (born 1955), Latvian judge, political scientist, lawyer and the President of Latvia
- Egīls Tēbelis (born 1972), Latvian hurdler
