= Þrúðheimr =

Home of Thor according to Grímnismál

In Nordic mythology, Þrúðheimr (anglicized Thrúdheim or Thrudheim), which means "home of strength" in Old Norse, is the home of Thor according to the Eddic poem Grímnismál (4). But in Snorri Sturluson's Edda (Gylfaginning, 21, 47; Skáldskaparmál, 17) and Ynglinga saga (5), the name of Thor's residence is Þrúðvangr or Þrúðvangar. Þrúðheimr is nevertheless mentioned in Snorri's Edda, but in its prologue. In this euhemerized story, it is written that Tror, "whom we call Thor", conquered the kingdom of Thrace, "which we call Þrúðheimr".

In Grímnismál (4), it is indicated that Þrúðheimr lies outside of Asgard, but near the world of the gods and elves.
