= Eigil =

Eigil may refer to:

- Eigil of Fulda (c. 750–822), Abbot of Fulda
- Eigil of Prüm (died 870), Abbot of Prüm, Abbot of Flavigny and Archbishop of Sens

== See also ==
- Egil (disambiguation)
