= Þrúðvangr =

Location in Norse mythology

In Norse mythology, Þrúðvangr (plural: Þrúðvangar; Old Norse: [ˈθruːðˌwɑŋɡz̠], "power-field", sometimes anglicized as Thrudvang or Thruthvang) is a field where the god Thor resides. The field is attested in the Prose Edda and in Heimskringla, both written by Snorri Sturluson in the 13th century.

In the Prose Edda book Gylfaginning, the enthroned figure of High tells Gangleri (King Gylfi in disguise) about the god Thor. Among other details, High mentions that Thor's realm is Þrúðvangr and that Thor owns the hall Bilskírnir, the largest of all buildings ever erected. Further in Gylfaginning, High mentions that Thor returned to Þrúðvangr after Útgarða-Loki's fortress disappeared. In the Prose Edda book Skáldskaparmál, Thor's battle with Hrungnir is recounted. The narration details that, after defeating Hrungnir and left with a whetstone lodged in his head, Thor returned to Þrúðvangr, where the völva Gróa unsuccessfully attempted to remove the stone.

In the Heimskringla book Ynglinga saga, the field is again mentioned, yet in euhemerized context; here Thor is a temple priest, and given Þrúðvangr, a location in Sweden, by Odin, here described as a powerful king.

== See also ==
- Fólkvangr, the afterlife field of the goddess Freyja
- Þrúðr, daughter of Thor
