= Egil Taule =

Norwegian businessperson (born 1934)

- Born: October 31, 1934 (age 91); Norway
- Education: Norwegian Institute of Technology (civil engineering, 1958)
- Occupation: Businessperson
- Known for: Senior executive roles in major Norwegian industrial companies

Egil Taule (born 31 October 1934) is a Norwegian businessperson.

He took his degree in civil engineering at the Norwegian Institute of Technology in 1958. He worked in both Germany and the United States, but spent the years 1974 to 2001 as a senior executive in Norway. He was president of Strømmen Stål and Norsk Elektrisk & Brown Boveri, vice president of Kongsberg Våpenfabrikk, then president of Norsk Jetmotor and TiTech Visionsort. He was a board member of SINTEF, S.D. Cappelen and the Federation of Norwegian Manufacturing Industries (TBL).

He resides in Østerås.
