= Egil Remi Jensen =

Norwegian newspaper editor (born 1929)

Egil Remi Jensen (born 6 November 1929) is a Norwegian retired newspaper editor.

== Life and career ==
Egil Remi Jensen was born in Vennesla Municipality on 6 November 1929. He was hired as a subeditor in the newspaper Fædrelandsvennen in 1957, and was the chief editor there from 1979 to 1995. He chaired the Norwegian Press Association from 1987 to 1989. He has also been a board member of the newspaper Agder.
