= Egill (Hymiskviða) =

Norse mythical character

In Norse mythology, Egil is the name of a farmer in the poem Hymiskvida who looked after Thor's goats while the god was visiting the giant Hymir.
