= Norse cosmology =

Account of the universe and its laws by the ancient North Germanic peoples

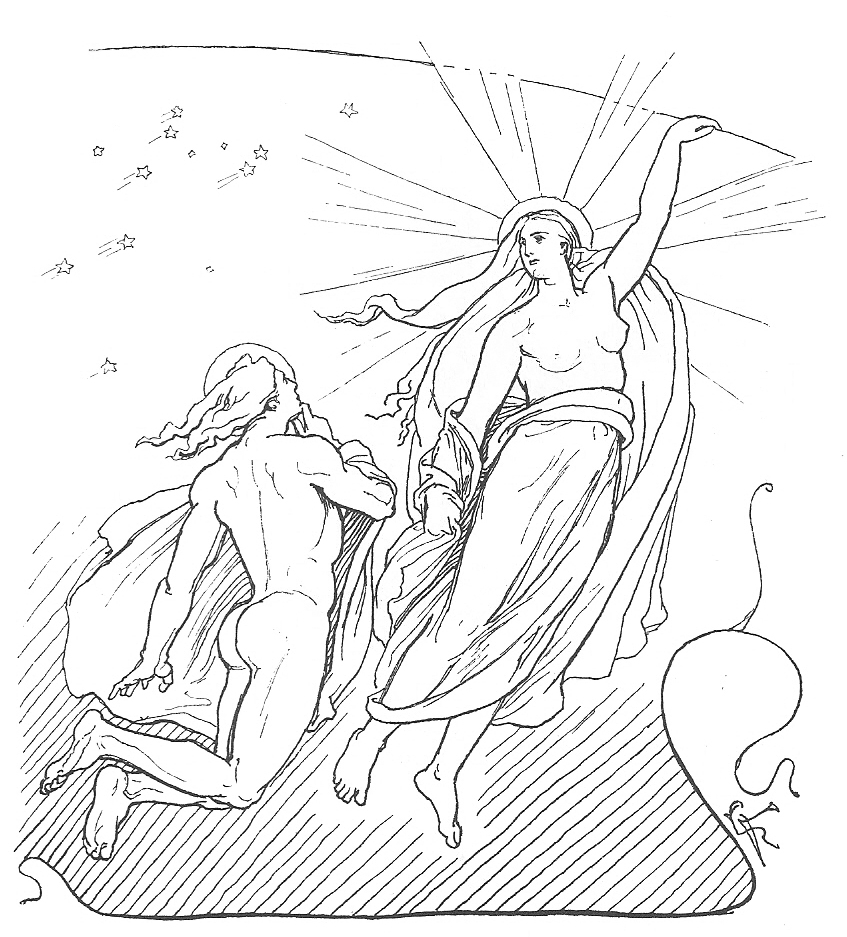
A depiction of the personified moon, Máni, and the personified Sun, Sól by Lorenz Frølich, 1895

Norse cosmology is the account of the universe and its laws by the ancient North Germanic peoples. The topic encompasses concepts from Norse mythology and Old Norse religion such as notations of time and space, cosmogony, personifications, anthropogeny, and eschatology. Like other aspects of Norse mythology, these concepts are primarily recorded from earlier oral sources in the Poetic Edda, a collection of poems compiled in the 13th century, and the Prose Edda, attributed to the Icelander Snorri Sturluson in the 13th century. Together these sources depict an image of Nine Worlds around a cosmic tree, Yggdrasil.

== Time and space ==
Concepts of time and space play a major role in the Old Norse corpus's presentation of Norse cosmology. While events in Norse mythology describe a somewhat linear progression, various scholars in ancient Germanic studies note that Old Norse texts may imply or directly describe a fundamental belief in cyclic time. According to scholar John Lindow, "the cosmos might be formed and reformed on multiple occasions by the rising sea."

== Cosmology ==
Drawing in part on various eddic poems, the Gylfaginning section of the Prose Edda contains an account of the development and creation of the cosmos: long before the Earth came to be, there existed the bright and flaming place called Muspell—a location so hot that foreigners may not enter it—and the foggy land of Niflheim. In Niflheim was a spring, Hvergelmir, and from it flow numerous rivers. Together these rivers, known as Élivágar, flowed further and further from their source. Eventually the poisonous substance within the flow came to harden and turn to ice. When the flow became entirely solid, a poisonous vapor rose from the ice and solidified into rime atop the solid river. These thick ice layers grew, in time spreading across the void of Ginnungagap.

The northern region of Ginnungagap continued to fill with weight from the growing substance and its accompanying blowing vapor, yet the southern portion of Ginnungagap remained clear due to its proximity to the sparks and flames of Muspell. Between Niflheim and Muspell, ice and fire, was a placid location, "as mild as a windless sky". When the rime and the blowing heat met, the liquid melted and dropped, and this mixture formed the primordial being Ymir, the ancestor of all jötnar. Ymir sweated while sleeping. From his left arm grew a male and female jötunn, "and one of his legs begot a son with another", and these limbs too produced children.

Ymir fed from rivers of milk that flowed from the teats of the primordial cow, Auðumbla. Auðumbla fed from salt she licked from rime stones. Over the course of three days, she licked free a beautiful and strong man, Búri. Búri's son Borr married a jötunn named Bestla, and the two had three sons: the gods Odin, Vili and Vé. The sons killed Ymir, and Ymir's blood poured across the land, producing great floods that killed all of the jötnar but two (Bergelmir and his unnamed wife, who sailed across the flooded landscape).

Odin, Vili, and Vé took Ymir's corpse to the center of Ginnungagap and carved it. They made the earth from Ymir's flesh; the rocks from his bones; from his blood the sea, lakes, and oceans; and scree and stone from his molars, teeth, and remaining bone fragments. They surrounded the earth's lands with sea, forming a circle. From Ymir's skull they made the sky, which they placed above the earth in four points, each held by a dwarf (Norðri, Suðri, Austri and Vestri—Old Norse 'north, south, east, and west', respectively).

After forming the dome of the Earth, the brothers Odin, Vili and Vé took sparks of light from Muspell and placed them around the Earth, both above and below. Some remained fixed and others moved through the sky in predetermined courses. The trio provided land for the jötnar to leave by the sea. Using Ymir's eyelashes, the trio built a fortification around the center of the landmass to contain the hostility of the jötnar. They called this fortification Miðgarðr (Old Norse 'central enclosure'). Finally, from Ymir's brains, they formed the clouds.

From Ymir's eyebrows they crafted a stronghold named Midgard. When they were walking along the seashore, they found two trees and shaped humans of them. Odin gave them spirit and life, Vili gave them wit and feeling, and Vé gave them form, speech, hearing, and sight. They gave them clothing and names: the man was called Askr, and the woman Embla. They were the ancestors of mankind who lived in Midgard. The brothers made for themselves in the middle of the world a city called Asgard, where the gods lived.

== Personifications ==
Personifications, such as those of astronomical objects, time, and water bodies occur in Norse mythology. The Sun is personified as a goddess, Sól (Old Norse 'Sun'); the moon is personified as a male entity, Máni (Old Norse 'moon'); and the Earth too is personified (Jörð, Old Norse 'earth'). Night appears personified as the female jötunn Nótt (Old Norse 'night'); day is personified as Dagr (Old Norse 'day'); and Dagr's father, the god Dellingr (Old Norse 'shining'), may in some manner personify the dawn. Bodies of water also receive personification, such as the goddess Rán, her jötunn husband Ægir, and their wave-maiden children, the Nine Daughters of Ægir and Rán.

== Yggdrasil ==
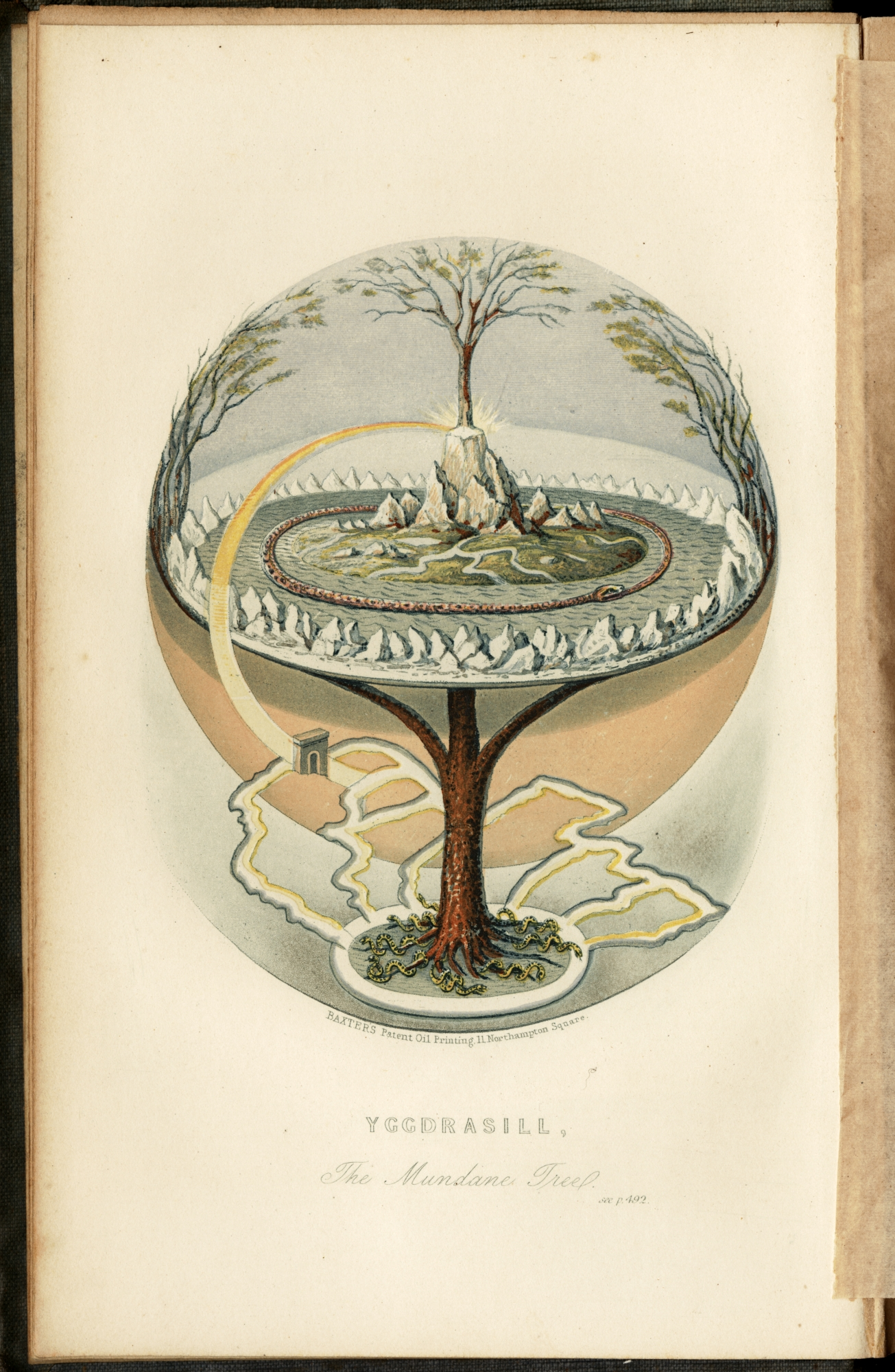
A 19th century attempt at illustrating Yggdrasil as described in the Prose Edda

Yggdrasil is a tree central to the Norse concept of the cosmos. The tree's branches extend into various realms, and various creatures dwell on and around it. The gods go to Yggdrasil daily to assemble at their things, traditional governing assemblies. The branches of Yggdrasil extend far into the heavens, and the tree is supported by three roots that extend far away into other locations; one to the well Urðarbrunnr in the heavens, one to the spring Hvergelmir, and another to the well Mímisbrunnr. Creatures live within Yggdrasil, including the dragon Níðhöggr, an unnamed eagle, and the stags Dáinn, Dvalinn, Duneyrr and Duraþrór.

== Nine Worlds ==
Old Norse texts mention the existence of Níu Heimar, translated by scholars as "Nine Worlds". According to the second stanza of the Poetic Edda poem Völuspá, the Nine Worlds surround the tree Yggdrasil. As recalled by a dead völva in the poem:

Henry Adams Bellows translation, 1923:

I remember yet the giants of yore,
Who gave me bread in the days gone by;
Nine worlds I knew, the nine in the tree
With mighty roots beneath the mold.

Jeramy Dodds translation, 2014:

I recall being reared by Jotuns,
in days long gone. If I look back, I recall
nine worlds, nine wood-witches,
that renowned tree of fate below the earth.

The Nine Worlds receive a second and final mention in the Poetic Edda in stanza 43 of the poem Vafþrúðnismál, where the wise jötunn Vafþrúðnir engages in a deadly battle of wits with the disguised god Odin:

Bellows translation, 1923:

Vafthruthnir spake:
"Of the runes of the gods and the giants' race
The truth indeed can I tell,
(For to every world have I won;)
To nine worlds came I, to Niflhel beneath,
The home where dead men dwell."

Dodds translation, 2014:

Vafthrudnir said:
"I can tell you the true secrets of the Jotun
and all the gods because I've journeyed
into all of the nine worlds below Niflhel
Where the dead dwell below Hel."

The Nine Worlds receive a single mention in the Prose Edda, occurring section 34 of the Gylfaginning portion of the book. The section describes how Odin threw Loki's daughter Hel into the underworld, and granted her power over all Nine Worlds:

Hel he threw into Niflheim and gave her authority over nine worlds, such that she has to administer board and lodging to those sent to her, and that is those who die of sickness or old age.

The Old Norse corpus does not clearly list the Nine Worlds, if it provides them at all. However, some scholars have proposed identifications for the nine. For example, Henry Adams Bellows (1923) says that the Nine Worlds consist of Ásgarðr, Vanaheimr, Álfheimr, Miðgarðr, Jötunheimr, Múspellsheimr, Svartálfaheimr, Niflheimr (sometimes Hel), and perhaps Niðavellir. Some editions of translations of the Poetic Edda and the Prose Edda feature illustrations of what the author or artist suspects the Nine Worlds to be in part based on the Völuspá stanza above.

== Anthropogeny ==
Askr and Embla—male and female respectively—were the first two humans, created by the gods from driftwood they encounter on a shore. The gods who form these first humans vary by source: According to the Poetic Edda poem Völuspá, they are Hœnir, Lóðurr and Odin, whereas in the Prose Edda they are Odin, Vili, and Vé.

== Eschatology ==
Ragnarök is a series of future events, including a great battle, foretold to ultimately result in the death of a number of major figures (including various deities), the occurrence of various natural disasters, and the subsequent submersion of the world in water.

Afterward, the world will resurface anew and fertile, the surviving and returning gods will meet, and mankind will be repopulated by Líf and Lífþrasir, who will emerge from Yggdrasil.

== See also ==
- Sacred trees and groves in Germanic paganism and mythology
- Ten realms
