= Élivágar =

Rivers in Norse mythology

In Norse mythology, Élivágar (Old Norse: [ˈeːleˌwɑːɣɑz̠]; "Ice Waves") are rivers that existed in Ginnungagap at the beginning of the world. The Prose Edda relates:

The streams called Ice-waves, those which were so long come from the fountain-heads that the yeasty atter upon them had hardened like the slag that runs out of the fire,-these then became ice; and when the ice halted and ceased to run, then it froze over above. But the drizzling rain that rose from the venom congealed to rime, and the rime increased, frost over frost, each over the other, even into Ginnungagap, the Yawning Void. Gylfaginning 5.

The eleven rivers traditionally associated with the Élivágar include the Svöl, Gunnþrá, Fjörm, Fimbulþul, Slíðr, Hríð, Sylgr, Ylgr, Við, Leiptr and Gjöll (which flows closest to the gate of Hel and is spanned by the bridge Gjallarbrú), although many other additional rivers are mentioned by name in both Eddas.

The rivers seem to act as borders between differing lands whether between the gods and the giants or between the mythological world and mortal world.

The Élivágar also figure in the origin of Ymir, the first giant. According to Vafthrúdnismál, Ymir was formed from the poison that dripped from the rivers.

In Gylfaginning, Snorri expands upon this notion considerably. As quoted above, when the venomous yeast from the Élivágar froze to ice and overspread its banks it fell as rain through the mild air of Ginnungagap. The rime, infused with the cold of Niflheim from which the Élivágar find their source in the wellspring Hvergelmir, began to fill the void. It then combined with the life-giving fire and heat of Muspelheim, melting and dripping and giving form to Ymir, progenitor of the rime giants or frost giants.

Elsewhere, Gylfaginning says that, "So many serpents are in Hvergelmir with Nídhögg that no tongue can tell them." These serpents are presumably the source of the venom or poison referred to in the myth.

A reference to the river Leiptr appears in Helgakviða Hundingsbana II, where the Valkyrie Sigrún puts a curse on her brother Dagr for having murdered her husband Helgi Hundingsbane despite him having sworn a holy oath of allegiance to Helgi on the "bright water of Leiptr" (ljósa Leiftrar vatni):

Þik skyli allir
eiðar bíta,
þeir er Helga
hafðir unna
at inu ljósa
Leiftrar vatni
ok at úrsvölum
Unnarsteini.

Now may every
oath thee bite
That with Helgi
sworn thou hast,
By the water
bright of Leipt,
And the ice-cold
stone of Uth.
