= Muspelheim =

Realm of fire in Norse mythology

In Norse cosmology, Muspelheim (Old Norse: Múspellsheimr), also called Muspell, is a realm of fire.

The etymology of Muspelheim is uncertain, but may come from Mund-spilli, "world-destroyers", "wreck of the world".

== Narrative ==
Muspelheim was described as a hot and glowing land of fire, home to the fire giants, and guarded by Surtr, with his flaming sword. It is featured in both the creation and destruction stories of Norse myth. According to the Prose Edda, a great time before the Earth was made, Niflheim existed. Inside Niflheim was a well called Hvergelmir, and from this well flowed numerous streams known as the Élivágar. Their names were Svol, Gunnthro, Form, Finbul, Thul, Slid and Hrid, Sylg and Ylg, Vid, Leipt and Gjoll.

After a time these streams had traveled sufficiently far from their source in Niflheim, that the venom that flowed within them hardened and turned to ice. When this ice eventually settled, rain rose up from it, and froze into rime. This ice then began to layer itself over the primordial void, Ginnungagap. This made the northern portion of Ginungagap thick with ice, and storms begin to form within.

In Norse mythology Muspelheim is located in the Southern east portion of Ginnungagap the Primordial void.

In the southern region of Ginnungagap, however, glowing sparks were still flying out of Muspelheim. When the heat and sparks from Muspelheim met the ice, it began to melt. The sparks would go on to create the Sun, Moon, and stars, and the drops of melted ice would form the primeval being Ymir: "By the might of him who sent the heat, the drops quickened into life and took the likeness of a man, who got the name Ymir. But the Frost giants call him Aurgelmir".

The Prose Edda section Gylfaginning foretells that the sons of Muspell will break the Bifröst bridge as part of the events of Ragnarök:

In the midst of this clash and din the heavens are rent in twain,
and the sons of Muspell come riding through the opening.
Surtr rides first, and before him and after him flames burning fire.
He has a very good sword, which shines brighter than the sun.
As they ride over Bifrost it breaks to pieces, as has before been stated.
The sons of Muspel direct their course to the plain which is called Vigrid ... .
The sons of Muspel have there effulgent bands alone by themselves.

== Depictions in popular culture ==
Muspelheim – called "Surt's sea of fire" – is mentioned in Hans Christian Andersen's fairy tale "The Marsh King's Daughter."

=== Comic books and their derived media ===
Muspelheim appears in different kinds of Marvel Entertainment media.

- Muspelheim is a realm in the Marvel Comics universe.
- In the Marvel Cinematic Universe, Muspelheim is first depicted in Thor: The Dark World (2013) during the Convergence and later in Thor: Ragnarok (2017). Muspelheim is depicted as a dyson sphere with rocky terrain.
- Muspelheim appears in Spider-Man and His Amazing Friends when Loki uses the Twins of the Gods to teleport Iceman to the Sea of Flame in Muspelheim.

=== Role playing games ===
The game Puzzle & Dragons features a monster entitled Flamedragon Muspelheim and Infernodragon Muspelheim.

In the game God of War, players can travel to Muspelheim where they can complete the six Trials of Muspelheim. When completing each trial, the player will receive rewards and will advance Kratos and Atreus closer to the top of a large volcano.

In the Dawn of Ragnarök expansion for Ubisoft's Assassin's Creed Valhalla, Surtr and massive armies of muspels from Muspelheim invade the dwarven realm of Svartalfheim, infecting large parts of it with pools and streams of magma.

In the mobile game Fire Emblem Heroes, the land of Muspell is a prevalent part of the game's second book, which heavily features the battle between Muspell and Niflheim.

In the MMORPG Runescape there is a planet/realm known simply as Muspell.

In the MMORPG Dark Age of Camelot there are three different realms based on different mythologies the players can choose to play in, one of them is called Midgard and is based on the Norse mythology. In Midgard there is a large region called Muspelheim which is an ashen wasteland with rivers of lava populated largely by giants and fire elemental beings.

God of War (2018) and God of War: Ragnarök feature Muspelheim as a visitable realm. In the former, the player and their companion battle through a gauntlet known as "Surtr's Trials," and in the latter, encounter Surtr himself and use him to begin Ragnarök, turning him into a monster of the same name.

== See also ==
- Muspilli
- Norse cosmology
