= Bartholomeus saga postola =

Old Norse account of Saint Bartholomew

Bartholomeus saga postola is an Old Norse account of the life of Saint Bartholomew. The account survives in five manuscripts from the period 1220–1375, including Codex Scardensis, and in five copies of these earlier manuscripts from the period 1600–1800; a summary survives in a manuscript from the 15th century. Of these manuscripts and copies, most are fragmentary or otherwise defective.

== "Queen Hel" ==
In Bartholomeus saga postola, Barthalomew is in his assigned apostolic territory of "India". The inhabitants there make sacrifices to an idol, and within the idol a devil hides who spiritually entraps men while appearing as if to cure their physical ills. Upon Bartholomew's arrival, he renders the devil impotent, demonstrating his own curative powers by curing the madness of the king's daughter. Bartholomew miraculously appears to the king while he is in his bedchamber, preaches to the king, and offers to expose the devils within the idols the following morning. The next morning, when the pagans start making sacrifices, the devil within the idol says:

"Stop sacrificing to me, you wretches, lest you have it worse; I am bound with fiery bonds by the angels of Jesus Christ, whom the Jews crucified, thinking him to be a man and susceptible to death; but he made war on Hel our queen and bound the very chieftain of Hell [or Hel, heliar hofđingia] with fiery bonds, and he arose from death on the third day, and gave the sign of his cross to his apostles and sent them into all corners of the earth; and now one of them has come here, and that is who has bound me."

Queen Hel is not mentioned again in the work. Michael Bell says that while Hel "might at first appear to be identical with the well-known pagan goddess of the Norse underworld" as described in chapter 34 of the Prose Edda book Gylfaginning, "in the combined light of the Old English and Old Norse versions of Nicodemus she casts quite a different a shadow", and that in Bartholomeus saga postola "she is clearly the queen of the Christian, not pagan, underworld".
