= Éljúðnir =

Hel's hall in Niflheim in Norse mythology

In Norse mythology, Éljúðnir (sometimes Anglicized to Eljudnir) is Hel's hall located in Niflheim as described in chapter 34 of Snorri Sturluson's Prose Edda in the book Gylfaginning. The name Éljúðnir [ˈeːlˌjuːðnez̠] is Old Norse and means "sprayed with snowstorms" or "damp with sleet or rain". The hall is only mentioned in this chapter.

== Features ==
The hall is described as featuring a threshold that is actually a pitfall called Fallandaforað meaning "falling to peril", her bed called Kör meaning "sick bed" that has bed curtains called Blikjandaböl which means "Gleaming Disaster".

== See also ==
- Niflheim
- Niflhel
