= Bound monster =

Norse mythological motif

The bound monster is an important motif in Norse mythology. The theme is that of an enemy of the gods who is bound or restrained in some way but destined to break free during the time of Ragnarök to cause destruction.

This pattern applies particularly to Loki and his three children by the giantess Angrboda - the wolf Fenrisulfr (or Fenrir), Jörmungandr (the Midgard Serpent) and Hel, queen of the underworld. Loki was bound in vengeance for his role in the death of Baldr, the full version of which tale is found in Gylfaginning. As Loki struggles in his bonds, his wife Sigyn holds a bowl over his head to catch the venom that drips continuously from a snake. At Ragnarök he will break free and fight against the gods, battling Heimdall in a mutually fatal duel.

Fenrir, whose role in the final days was revealed through prophecy, was leashed by the gods with a magical fetter created by the dwarfs. He refused to let himself be bound until one of the gods agreed to place a hand in his mouth as a pledge of release. Only Tyr was brave enough to do this, and as the chain tightened around Fenrir, he sensed their deception and bit off the right hand of the god. At Ragnarök, the wolf is destined to break his bond and kill Odin, whose death will then be avenged by the god Vidar.

For similar reasons as Fenrir, Jörmungandr and Hel are also considered bound monsters, though in somewhat less apparent ways. The serpent was banished to the outer waters of Midgard where he lay encircling the earth with his tail in his mouth, which in itself is a form of binding. He will rise up from the ocean during Ragnarök when he and Thor will fight one another, resulting first in the death of Jörmungandr followed by that of Thor as he succumbs to the serpent's aerosolized poison. Hel was likewise banished to Niflheim, the land of the dead, as its queen. Although she is the ruler of her domain, she is bound by the confines of her realm, and her retaliatory role during Ragnarök will be represented by the frost giants and a great army of the ordinary dead marching forth under the banner of Loki.

== See also ==
- Katechon
