= Ymir =

Primeval being in Norse mythology

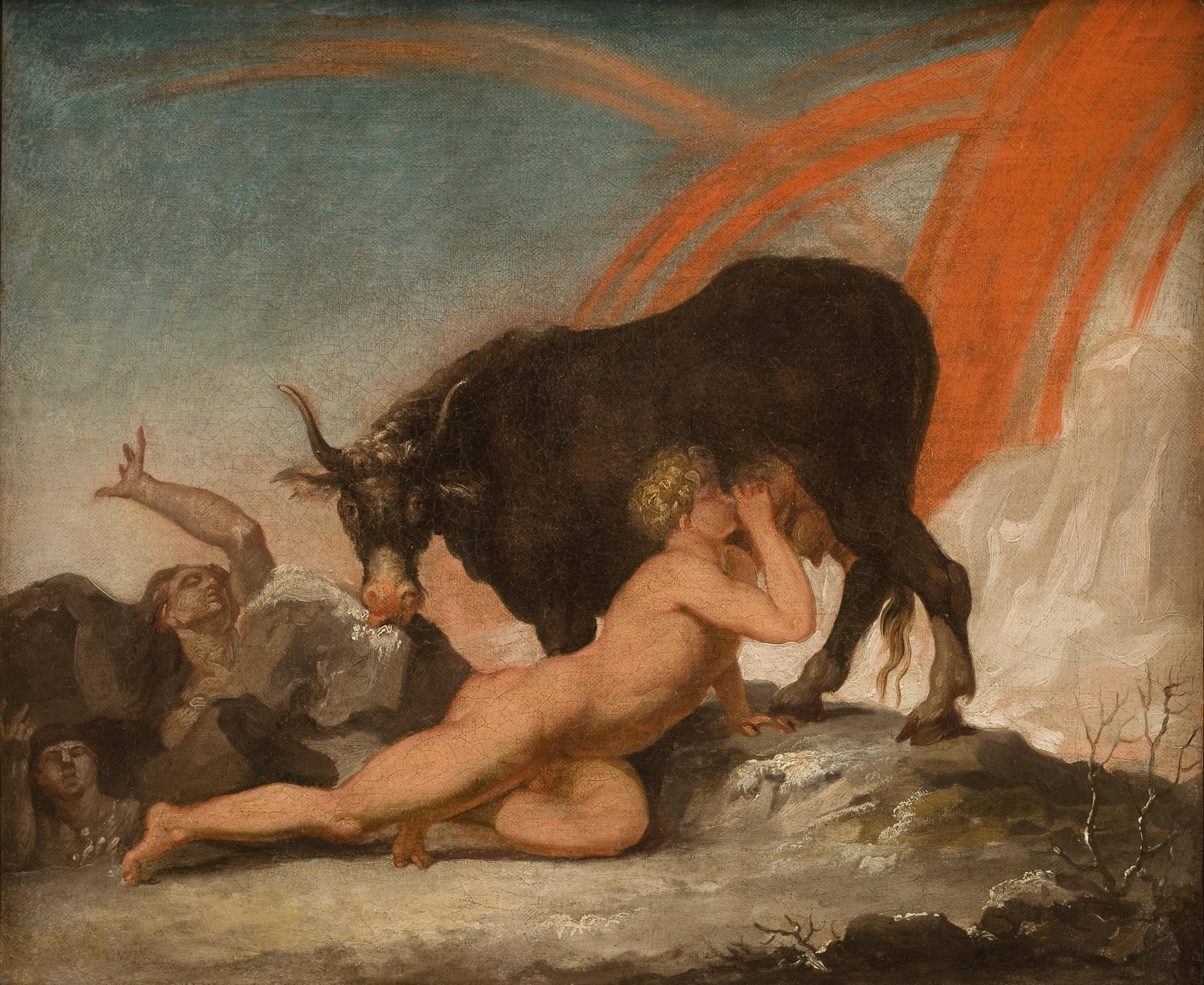
Ymir sucks at the udder of Auðumbla as she licks Búri out of the ice in a painting by Nicolai Abildgaard, 1790.

In Norse mythology, Ymir (/ˈiːmɪər/), also called Aurgelmir, Brimir, or Bláinn, is the ancestor of all jötnar. Ymir is attested in the Poetic Edda, compiled in the 13th century from earlier traditional material, in the Prose Edda, written by Snorri Sturluson in the 13th century, and in the poetry of skalds. Taken together, several stanzas from four poems collected in the Poetic Edda refer to Ymir as a primeval being who was born from atter (Old Norse: eitr), yeasty venom that dripped from the icy rivers called the Élivágar, and lived in the grassless void of Ginnungagap.

Ymir gave birth to a male and female from his armpits, and his legs together begat a six-headed being. The grandsons of Búri, the gods Odin and Vili and Vé, fashioned the Earth—elsewhere personified as a goddess named Jörð—from Ymir's flesh; the oceans from his blood; from his bones, the mountains; from his hair, the trees; from his brains, the clouds; from his skull, the heavens; and from his eyebrows, the middle realm in which humankind lives, Midgard. In addition, one stanza relates that the dwarfs were given life by the gods from Ymir's flesh and blood (or the Earth and sea).

In the Prose Edda, a narrative is provided that draws from, adds to, and differs from the accounts in the Poetic Edda. According to the Prose Edda, after Ymir was formed from the elemental drops, so too was Auðumbla, a primeval cow, whose milk Ymir fed from. The Prose Edda also states that three gods, the brothers Odin, Vili and Vé, killed Ymir, and details that, upon Ymir's death, his blood caused an immense flood. Scholars have debated as to what extent Snorri's account of Ymir is an attempt to synthesize a coherent narrative for the purpose of the Prose Edda and to what extent Snorri drew from traditional material outside of the corpus that he cites. By way of historical linguistics and comparative mythology, scholars have linked Ymir to Tuisto, the Proto-Germanic being attested by Tacitus in his 1st century CE ethnography Germania and have identified Ymir as an echo of a primordial being reconstructed in Proto-Indo-European mythology.

== Attestations ==
=== Poetic Edda ===
Ymir is mentioned in four poems in the Poetic Edda; Völuspá, Vafþrúðnismál, Grímnismál, and Hyndluljóð. In Völuspá, in which an undead völva imparts knowledge to the god Odin, references are twice made to Ymir. In the first instance, the third stanza of the poem, Ymir is mentioned by name. In the translations below, the name of the location Ginnungagap is translated as "chaotic chasm" (Thorpe, 1866) and "yawning gap" (Bellows):

There was in times of old, where Ymir dwelt,
nor sand nor sea, nor gelid waves;
earth existed not, nor heaven above,
'twas a chaotic chasm, and grass nowhere.

— B. Thorpe translation

Of old was the age when Ymir lived;
Sea nor cool waves nor sand there were;
Earth had not been, nor heaven above,
But a yawning gap, and grass nowhere.

— H. A. Bellows translation

Later in the poem, a few other references are apparently made to Ymir as Brimir and Bláinn (here anglicized as Blain). In this stanza, Thorpe has treated Brimir (Old Norse "the bloody moisture") and Blain (Old Norse, disputed) as common nouns. Brimir and Blain are usually held to be proper names that refer to Ymir, as in Bellows's translation:

Then went all the powers to their judgement-seats,
the all-holy gods, and thereon held council,
who should of the dwarfs race create,
from the sea-giant's blood and livid bones.

Then sought the gods their assembly-seats,
The holy ones, and council held,
To find who should raise the race of dwarfs
Out of Brimir's blood and the legs of Blain.

In the poem Vafþrúðnismál, the (disguised) god Odin engages the wise jötunn Vafþrúðnir in a game of wits. Odin asks Vafþrúðnir to tell him, if Vafþrúðnir's knowledge is sufficient, the answer to a variety of questions. In the first of which that refers to Ymir, Odin asks from where first came the Earth and the sky. The jötunn responds with a creation account involving Ymir:

From Ymir's flesh the earth was formed,
and from his bones the hills,
the heaven from the skull of that ice-cold giant,
and from his blood the sea.

Out of Ymir's flesh was fashioned the earth,
And the mountains were made of his bones;
The sky from the frost cold giant's skull,
And the ocean out of his blood.

As the verbal battle continues, a few more exchanges directly refer to or may allude to Ymir. Odin asks what ancient jötun is the eldest of "Ymir's kin", and Vafþrúðnir responds that long, long ago it was Bergelmir, who was Þrúðgelmir's son and Aurgelmir's grandson. In the next stanza, Odin asks where Aurgelmir came from so long ago, to which Vafþrúðnir responds that venom dropped from Élivágar, and that these drops grew until they became a jötunn, and from this being descends the jötnar. Finally, Odin asks how this being begat children, as he did not know the company of a female jötunn, to which Vafþrúðnir responds that from beneath the ancient jötunn's armpits together a girl and a boy grew, and his feet together produced a six-headed jötunn.

In the poem Grímnismál, the god Odin (disguised as "Grímnir") imparts in the young Agnarr cosmological knowledge. In one stanza, Odin mentions Ymir as he recalls the fashioning of the world from his body:

Of Ymir's flesh was earth created,
of his blood the sea,
of his bones the hills,
of his hair trees and plants,
of his skull the heaven;

and of his brows the gentle powers
formed Midgard for the sons of men;
but of his brain
the heavy clouds are all created.

Out of Ymir's flesh was fashioned the earth,
And the ocean out of his blood;
Of his bones the hills, of his hair the trees,
Of his skull the heavens high.

Mithgarth the gods from his eyebrows made,
And set for the sons of men;
And out of his brain the baleful clouds
They made to move on high."

In a stanza of Völuspá hin skamma (found in the poem Hyndluljóð), Ymir receives one more mention. According to the stanza, völvas are descended from Viðòlfr, all seers from Vilmeiðr, all charm-workers from Svarthöfði, and all jötnar descend from Ymir.

=== Prose Edda ===
Ymir is mentioned in two books of the Prose Edda; Gylfaginning and Skáldskaparmál. In the first mention, in chapter 5 of Gylfaginning, High, Just-As-High, and Third tell Gangleri (the disguised mythical king Gylfi) about how all things came to be. The trio explain that the first world to exist was Muspell, a glowing, fiery southern region consisting of flames, uninhabitable by non-natives. After "many ages" Niflheimr was made, and within it lies a spring, Hvergelmir, from which eleven rivers flow.

Gangleri asks the three what things were like before mankind. High continues that these icy rivers, which are called Élivágar, ran so far from their spring source that the poisonous matter that flows with them became hard "like the clinker that comes from a furnace" – it turned to ice. And so, when this ice came to a halt and stopped flowing, the vapor that rose up from the poison went in the same direction and froze to rime. This rime increased, layer upon layer, across Ginnungagap.

Just-As-High adds that the northern part of Ginnungagap was heavy with ice and rime, and vapor and blowing came inward from this. Yet the southern part of Ginunngagap was clear on account of the sparks and molten flecks flying from Muspell. Third assesses that "just as from Niflheim there was coldness and all things grim, so what was facing close to Muspell was hot and bright, but Ginunngagap was as mild as a windless sky". Third adds that when the rime and hot air met, it thawed and dripped, and the liquid intensely dropped. This liquid fell into the shape of a man, and so he was named Ymir and known among the jötnar as Aurgelmir, all of which descend from him. In support of these two names, Third quotes a stanza each from Völuspá hin skamma and Vafþrúðnismál.

Gangleri asks how generations grew from Ymir, how other beings came into existence, and if Ymir was considered a god. High says that Ymir was no god, and "he was evil and all his descendants." High explains that Ymir is the ancestor of all jötnar (specifically hrimthursar) and that when Ymir slept, he sweated, and from his left and right arm grew a male and a female, and his left leg produced a son with his right leg, and from them came generations.

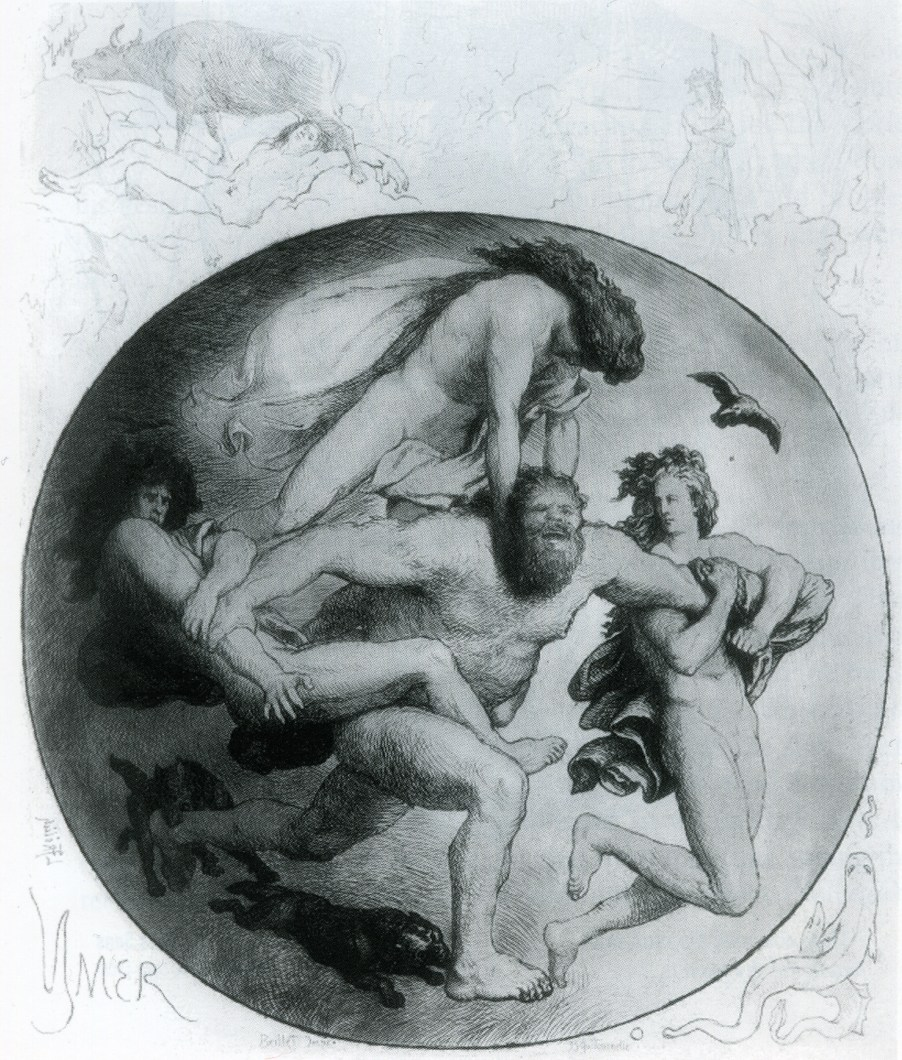
Ymir is attacked by the brothers Odin, Vili, and Vé in an illustration by Lorenz Frølich.

Gangleri asks where Ymir lived and what sustained him. High explains that the drips next produced a cow named Auðumbla. From her teats flowed four rivers of milk, and from it fed Ymir. Gangleri asks what the cow fed from, and High responds that the cow licked salty rime-stones. The first day Auðumbla licked the rime stones it uncovered that evening the hair of a man. The second day it uncovered his head. The third day a man was uncovered from the ice. This man was named Búri, and was large, powerful, and beautiful to behold. Búri had a son, Borr, who married a jötunn, Bestla, the daughter of Bölþorn. The two had three sons: Odin, Vili, and Vé. High adds that "Odin and his brothers must be the rulers of heaven and earth; it is our opinion that this must be what he is called. This is the name of one who is the greatest and most glorious that we know, and you would well to agree to call him that too".

High relates that Odin, Vili, and Vé killed Ymir, and his body produced so much blood from his wounds that within it drowned all the jötnar but two, Bergelmir, who, on a lúðr with his (unnamed) wife, survived and repopulated the jötnar.

Gangleri asks what, if High, Just-As-High, and Third believe the trio to be gods, what the three did then. High says that the trio took the body into the middle of Ginnungagap and from his flesh fashioned the Earth, from his blood the sea and lakes, from his bones rocks, scree and stones his teeth, molars, and bones. Just-As-High adds that from his gushing wounds they created the sea that surrounds the Earth. Third says that the trio took his skull and placed it above the Earth and from it made the sky. They placed the sky above the earth, and, to hold up the sky, they placed four dwarfs – Norðri, Suðri, Austri and Vestri – at its four corners. The trio took the molten particles and sparks that flew from Muspell and "they fixed all the lights, some in the sky, some moved in a wandering course beneath the sky, but they appointed them positions and ordained their courses". Third cites a stanza from Völuspá in support, stating that by ways of these sky lights days and years were reckoned and counted, and that the stanza reflects that the cosmological bodies did not know their places prior to the creation of earth.

Gangleri comments that what he has just heard is remarkable, as the construction is both immense and made with great skill, and asks how the earth was arranged. High replies that the world is circular, and around it lies the depths of the sea. Along the shore the gods gave land to the jötnar. However, on the inner side on earth they made a fortification against the hostility of the jötnar out of Ymir's eyelashes. This fortification they called Midgard. Further, they took Ymir's brains and threw them skyward, and from them made clouds. Another two stanzas from Völuspá are cited in support.

Later in Gylfaginning High explains the origin of the dwarfs. High says that after Asgard had been built, the gods assembled on their thrones and held their things. There they "discussed where the dwarfs had been generated from in the soil and down in the earth like maggots in flesh. The dwarfs had taken shape first and acquired life in the flesh of Ymir and were then maggots, but by decision of the gods they became conscious with intelligence and had the shape of men though they live in the earth and in rocks". Stanzas from Völuspá consisting of dwarf names are then provided to show the lineage of the dwarfs.

In the book Skáldskaparmál poetic means of referring to the sky are provided, some of which relate to the narrative in Gylfaginning involving Ymir, including "Ymir's skull" and "jötunn's skull", or "burden of the dwarfs" or "helmet of Vestri and Austri, Sudri, Nordri". A portion of a work by the 11th century skald Arnórr jarlaskáld is also provided, which refers to the sky as "Ymir's old skull". Later in Skáldskaparmál poetic terms for the earth are provided, including "Ymir's flesh", followed by a section for poetic terms for "sea", which provides a portion of a work by the skald Ormr Barreyjarskáld where the sea is referred to as "Ymir's blood". Both the names Aurgelmir and Ymir appear in a list of jötnar in the Nafnaþulur section of Skáldskaparmál.

== Reception ==
=== Lost sources ===
As Gylfaginning presents a cohesive narrative that both quotes stanzas from various poems found in the Poetic Edda (as outlined above) as well as contains unique information without a provided source (such as Auðumbla); scholars have debated to what extent Snorri had access to outside sources that no longer survive and to what extent he synthesized a narrative from the material he had access to.

Regarding the situation, scholar Gabriel Turville-Petre comments (1964) that "at the beginning, according to Snorri's text of the poem, there was nothing but a void, although according to other texts, the giant Ymir existed already then. Considering how Ymir (Aurgelmir) was said to have taken shape, both Snorri and the Vafþrúðnismál, we may think that Snorri followed the better version of Vǫluspá" and, regarding Snorri's account of the cosmogenesis in general, that "from these sketches of the poetic sources from which he chiefly drew it is obvious that Snorri described several incidents which cannot be traced to them, at least in their extant forms". Turville-Petre cites Snorri's account of Auðumbla as a prime example, noting Indo-European parallels (Persian and Vedic) and an Egyptian parallel in the Egyptian goddess Hathor.

H.R.E. Davidson (1964) comments that "the original form of the creation myth in the north is not easy to determine. Snorri knew of at least three separate accounts".

=== Tuisto, parallels, and Proto-Indo-European religion ===
In the 1st century CE, Roman historian Tacitus writes in his ethnography Germania that the Germanic peoples sang songs about a primeval god who was born of the Earth named Tuisto, and that he was the progenitor of the Germanic peoples. Tuisto is the Latinized form of a Proto-Germanic theonym that is a matter of some debate. By way of historical linguistics some scholars have linked Tuisto to the Proto-Germanic theonym *Tiwaz, while other scholars argue that the name refers to a "two-fold" or hermaphroditic being (compare Old Swedish tvistra, meaning "separate"). The latter etymology has led scholars to a connection to Ymir on both linguistic and mythographic grounds.

By way of historical linguistics and comparative mythology, scholars have linked Ymir to other primordial, sometimes hermaphroditic or twin beings in other Indo-European mythologies and have reconstructed elements of a Proto-Indo-European cosmological dissection. Citing Ymir as a prime example, scholars D.Q. Adams and J.P. Mallory comment that "the [Proto-Indo-European] cosmogonic myth is centered on the dismemberment of a divine being – either anthropomorphic or bovine – and the creation of the universe out of its various elements". Further examples cited include the climactic ending of the Old Irish Táin Bó Cúailnge where a bull is dissected that makes up the Irish geography, and apparently Christianized forms of the myth found in the Old Russian Poem of the Dove Book (Голубиная книга), the Frisian Frisian Code of Emsig, and Irish manuscript BM MS 4783, folio 7a. Other examples given include Ovid's 1st century BCE to 1st century BCE Latin Metamorphoses description of the god Atlas's beard and hair becoming forests, his bones becoming stone, his hands mountain ridges, and so forth; the 9th century AD Middle Persian Škend Gumānīg Wizār, wherein the malevolent being Kūnī's skin becomes the sky, from his flesh comes the earth, his bones the mountains, and from his hair comes plants; and the 10th century BCE Old Indic Purusha sukta from the Rig Veda, which describes how the primeval man Purusha was dissected; from his eye comes the sun, from his mouth fire, from his breath wind, from his feet the earth, and so on. Among surviving sources, Adams and Mallory summarize that "the most frequent correlations, or better, derivations, are the following: Flesh = Earth, Bone = Stone, Blood = Water (the sea, etc.), Eyes = Sun, Mind = Moon, Brain = Cloud, Head = Heaven, Breath = Wind".

Adams and Mallory write that "In both cosmogonic myth and the foundation element of it, one of the central aspects is the notion of sacrifice (of a brother, giant, bovine, etc.). The relationship between sacrifice and cosmogony was not solely that of a primordial event but the entire act of sacrifice among the Indo-Europeans might be seen as a re-creation of the universe where elements were being continuously recycled. ... Sacrifice thus represents a creative re-enactment of the initial cosmic dismemberment of a victim and it helps return the material stuff to the world".

=== Other ===
Davidson further links accounts of the jötunn Þjazi's eyes flung into the heavens by Odin and the frozen toe of Aurvandil tossed into the sky by the god Thor, the eyes in the prior case becoming stars and the toe in the latter case becoming a star known as "Aurvandil's Toe". Davidson comments that "these myths are evidently connected with names of constellations, but the strange reference to a frozen toe suggests that there is some connexion with the creation legend of the giant that emerged from the ice".

== See also ==
- Cosmic Man
- Hyperion (Titan)
- Jamshid (Yima in Avestan)
- Pangu
- Tiamat
