= Well of wisdom =

The Well of Wisdom may refer to:

- In Norse mythology, at the foot of Yggdrasil, an ever-green ash-tree:
  - Urðarbrunnr, where the gods hold court
  - Mímisbrunnr, the place of Wóden's ordeal
  - Hvergelmir, the wellspring of cold
- Connla's Well in Irish mythology, containing the Salmon of Wisdom
