= Gjöll =

One of the eleven rivers in Norse mythology

Gjöll (Old Norse: Gjǫll [ˈɡjɔlː]) is the river that separates the living from the dead in Norse mythology. It is one of the eleven rivers traditionally associated with the Élivágar, rivers that existed in Ginnungagap at the beginning of the world.

According to Snorri Sturluson's Gylfaginning, Gjöll originates from the wellspring Hvergelmir in Niflheim, flowing through Ginnungagap, and thence into the worlds of existence. Gjöll is the river that flows closest to the gate of the underworld. Within the Norse mythology, the dead must cross the Gjallarbrú, the bridge over Gjöll, to reach Hel. The bridge, which was guarded by Móðguðr, was crossed by Hermóðr during his quest to retrieve Baldr from the land of the dead.

In Gylfaginning, Gjöll is one of eleven rivers that rise from Hvergelmir. In the following chapter, these are called the Élivágar and are said to have flowed in Ginnungagap in primordial times.

Gjöll has a parallel with similar mythological rivers from Indo-European cultures such as the Greek Styx and the Hindu Vaitarani.

Gjöll is also the name of the boulder to which the monstrous wolf Fenrir is bound. The word has been translated as "noisy".

== See also ==
- Bifröst
- Gjallarhorn
- Hitfun - Mandaeism
- Hubur - Mesopotamian mythology
- Sanzu River - Japanese Buddhism
- Styx - Greek mythology
- Vaitarna River (mythological) - Hinduism and Buddhism
- Gyoll - Fictional river in Gene Wolfe's Book of the New Sun

== Other sources ==
- Bellows, Henry Adams (1923) The Poetic Edda (American-Scandinavian Foundation)
- Orchard, Andy (1997) Dictionary of Norse Myth and Legend (Cassell) ISBN 0-304-34520-2
- Simek, Rudolf (2007) translated by Angela Hall Dictionary of Northern Mythology (D.S. Brewer) ISBN 0-85991-513-1
