= Gjallarbrú =

Location in Norse mythology

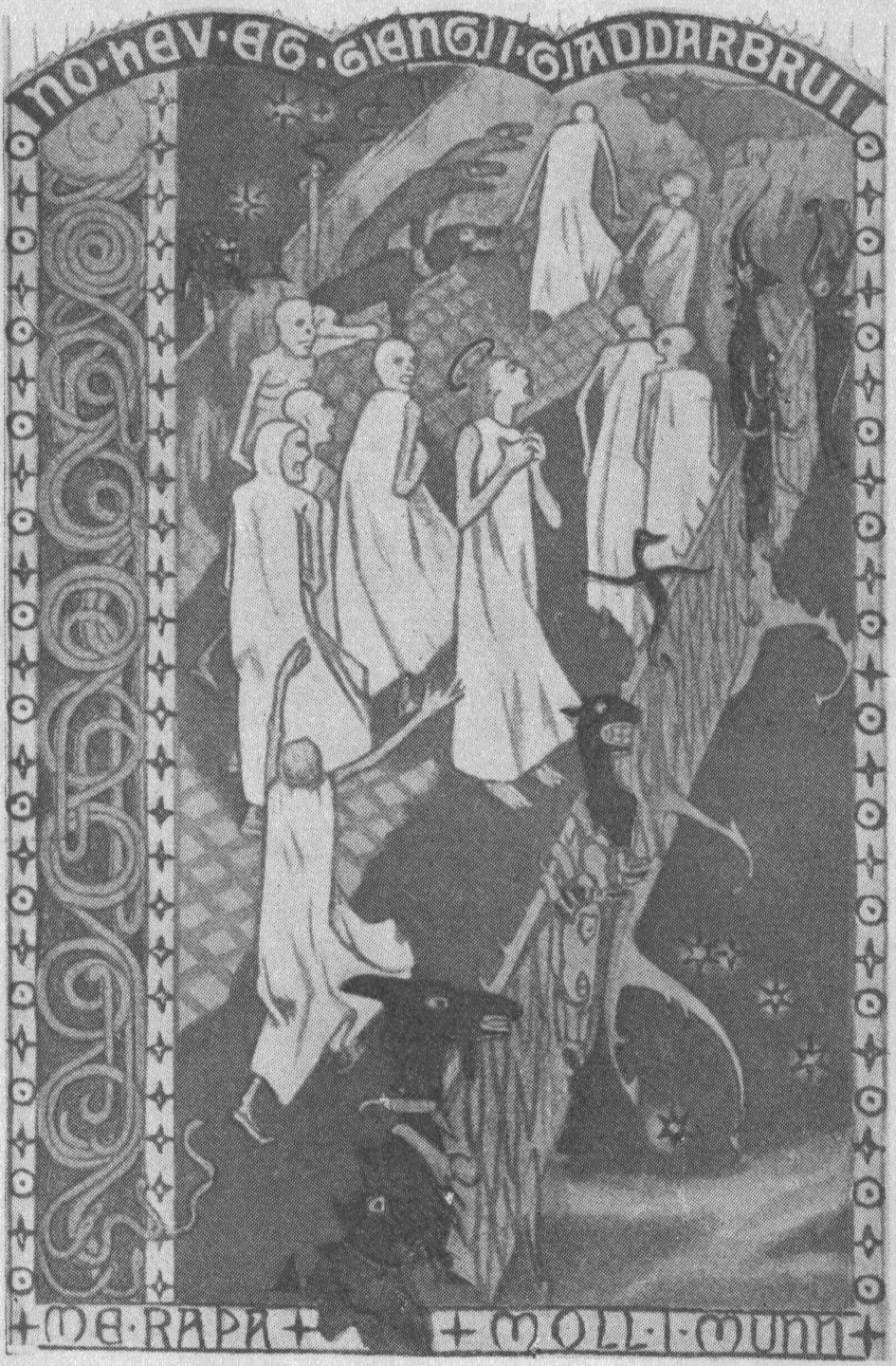
Gjallarbrui. Illustration by Gerhard Munthe, 1904.

In Norse mythology, Gjallarbrú (lit. "bridge of Gjöll") is a bridge that crosses the river Gjöll, serving as the passage to reach Hel.

It figures most prominently in Snorri Sturluson's Gylfaginning, in the section of the Baldr myth that recounts Hermód's journey to Hel in an attempt to retrieve Baldr. After riding for nine nights through deep, dark valleys, Hermód reaches the bridge, where he converses with Módgud, the maiden who guards it. She asks his name and lineage and informs him that five companies of dead men crossed the bridge the previous day, yet it trembles no more beneath their passage than under his alone, and he does not resemble the dead.

When she inquires about his purpose, Hermód explains his mission and asks whether Baldr has passed that way. She replies that Baldr has indeed come and directs him onward, stating that the road to Hel lies downwards and to the north. Snorri adds that the bridge is thatched with glittering gold.

== Other sources ==
- Bellows, Henry Adams (1923) The Poetic Edda (American-Scandinavian Foundation)
- Orchard, Andy (1997) Dictionary of Norse Myth and Legend (Cassell) ISBN 0-304-34520-2
- Simek, Rudolf (2007) translated by Angela Hall Dictionary of Northern Mythology (D.S. Brewer) ISBN 0-85991-513-1
