= Nibelheim =

Nibelheim may refer to:

- Niflheim, a region in Germanic and Norse mythology
- Nibelheim or "Nibel Home", the home of the dwarves known as Nibelungs in Richard Wagner's Der Ring des Nibelungen
- Nibelheim (Final Fantasy VII), the hometown of protagonists Cloud Strife and Tifa Lockhart, in the video game Final Fantasy VII
