= Ylg =

Ylg or YLG may refer to:

- Ylg or Ylgr, one of the Nordic ice rivers or Élivágar
- YLG, a pseudonym of Yehuda Leib Gordon
