= NIFL =

NIFL may refer to:

- Northern Ireland Football League
- National Indoor Football League
- Nifl (mist), as in Niflheim (Mist World) of Norse mythology
