= Fjorm =

Fjorm may refer to:

- One of eleven rivers in Élivágar (Norse mythology)
- Fjorm, a main character in the storyline for the mobile phone role-playing game Fire Emblem Heroes
