= Niflhel =

Location in Norse mythology

Niflhel ("Misty Hel"; Nifel meaning fog) is a location in Norse mythology which appears in the eddic poems Vafþrúðnismál and Baldrs draumar, and also in Snorri Sturluson's Gylfaginning. According to Snorri Sturluson's work, Niflhel could be interpreted as the lowest level of Hel, but Niflhel and sometimes Hel are conflated with the concept of Niflheim, a term which originates with Sturluson.

== Prose Edda ==
=== Gylfaginning ===
In Gylfaginning by Snorri Sturluson, Gylfi, the old king of Scandinavia, receives an education in Norse mythology from Odin himself in the guise of three men. Gylfi learns from Odin (as Þriði) that Odin gave the first man his spirit, and that the spirits of just men will live forever in Gimlé, whereas those of evil men will live forever in Niflhel:

"The greatest of all is this: that he made man, and gave him the spirit, which shall live and never perish, though the flesh-frame rot to mould, or burn to ashes; and all men shall live, such as are just in action, and be with himself in the place called Gimlé. But evil men go to Hel and thence down to the Misty Hel; and that is down in the ninth world."

== Poetic Edda ==
=== Vafþrúðnismál ===
In Vafþrúðnismál, Odin has wagered his head in a contest of wits with the giant (jotun) Vafþrúðnir. Odin asks Vafþrúðnir whether he can tell all the secrets of the gods and giants, and Vafþrúðnir answers that he can do so since he has been to all the nine worlds, including Niflhel:

Vafþrúðnir kvað: 43. "Frá jötna rúnum; ok allra goða ek kann segja satt, því at hvern hef ek heim of komit; níu kom ek heima fyr Niflhel neðan; hinig deyja ór helju halir."	Vafthruthnir spake: 43. "Of the runes of the gods; and the giants' race The truth indeed can I tell, (For to every world have I won;) To nine worlds came I, to Niflhel beneath, The home where dead men dwell."

=== Baldrs draumar ===
Though not a part of the Codex Regius, in the poem Baldrs draumar, Odin makes a visit to Niflhel himself in order to enquire about the bad dreams of his son Baldr:

Upp reis Óðinn, alda gautr, ok hann á Sleipni söðul of lagði; reið hann niðr þaðan niflheljar til; mætti hann hvelpi, þeim er ór helju kom.	2. Then Othin rose, the enchanter old, And the saddle he laid on Sleipnir's back; Thence rode he down to Niflhel deep, And the hound he met that came from hell.
