= Hermóðr =

Norse deity

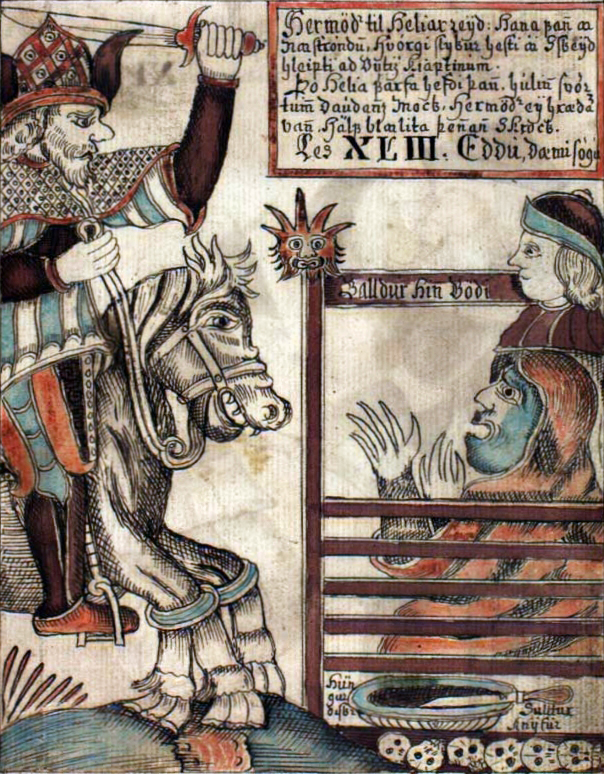
Hermóðr rides to Hel on Sleipnir. He meets Hel and Baldr. From the 18th century Icelandic manuscript NKS 1867 4to.

Hermóðr (Old Norse: [ˈhermˌoːðz̠], "war-spirit"; anglicized as Hermod) is a figure in Norse mythology, a son of the god Odin and brother of Baldr.

== Attestations ==
=== Prose Edda ===
Hermóðr appears distinctly in section 49 of the Prose Edda book Gylfaginning. There, it is described that the gods were speechless and devastated at the death of Baldr, unable to react due to their grief. After the gods gathered their wits from the immense shock and grief of Baldr's death, Frigg asked the Æsir who amongst them wished "to gain all of her love and favor" by riding the road to Hel. Whoever agreed was to offer Hel a ransom in exchange for Baldr's return to Asgard. Hermóðr agreed to this and set off with Sleipnir to Hel.

Hermóðr rode Odin's horse Sleipnir for nine nights through deep and dark valleys to the Gjöll bridge covered with shining gold, the bridge being guarded by the maiden Móðguðr 'Battle-frenzy' or 'Battle-tired'. Móðguðr told Hermóðr that Baldr had already crossed the bridge and that Hermóðr should ride downwards and northwards.

Upon coming to Hel's gate, Hermóðr dismounted, tightened Sleipnir's girth, mounted again, and spurred Sleipnir so that Sleipnir leapt entirely over the gate. So at last Hermóðr came to Hel's hall and saw Baldr seated in the most honorable seat. Hermóðr begged Hel to release Baldr, citing the great weeping for Baldr among the Æsir. Thereupon Hel announced that Baldr would only be released if all things, dead and alive, wept for him.

Baldr gave Hermóðr the ring Draupnir which had been burned with him on his pyre, to take back to Odin. Nanna gave a linen robe for Frigg along with other gifts and a finger-ring for Fulla. Thereupon Hermóðr returned with his message.

Hermóðr is called "son" of Odin in most manuscripts, while in the Codex Regius version—normally considered the best manuscript—Hermóðr is called sveinn Óðins 'Odin's boy', which in the context is as likely to mean 'Odin's servant'. However Hermóðr in a later passage is called Baldr's brother and also appears as son of Odin in a list of Odin's sons. See Sons of Odin.

=== Poetic Edda ===
The name Hermóðr seems to be applied to a mortal hero in the eddic poem Hyndluljóð (stanza 2):

The favour of the Highfather we seek to find,

To his followers gold he gladly gives;
To Hermóðr he gave helm and mail-coat,

And to Sigmund he gave a sword as a gift.

=== Skaldic poetry ===
In the skaldic poem Hákonarmál (stanza 14) Hermóðr and Bragi appear in Valhalla receiving Hákon the Good. It is not certain that either Hermóðr or Bragi is intended to be a god in this poem.

=== Beowulf ===
In the Old English poem Beowulf, Heremod is a Danish king who was driven into exile and in Old English genealogies Heremod appears appropriately as one of the descendants of Sceafa and usually as the father of Scyld.
