= Hel (location) =

Location in Norse mythology and paganism

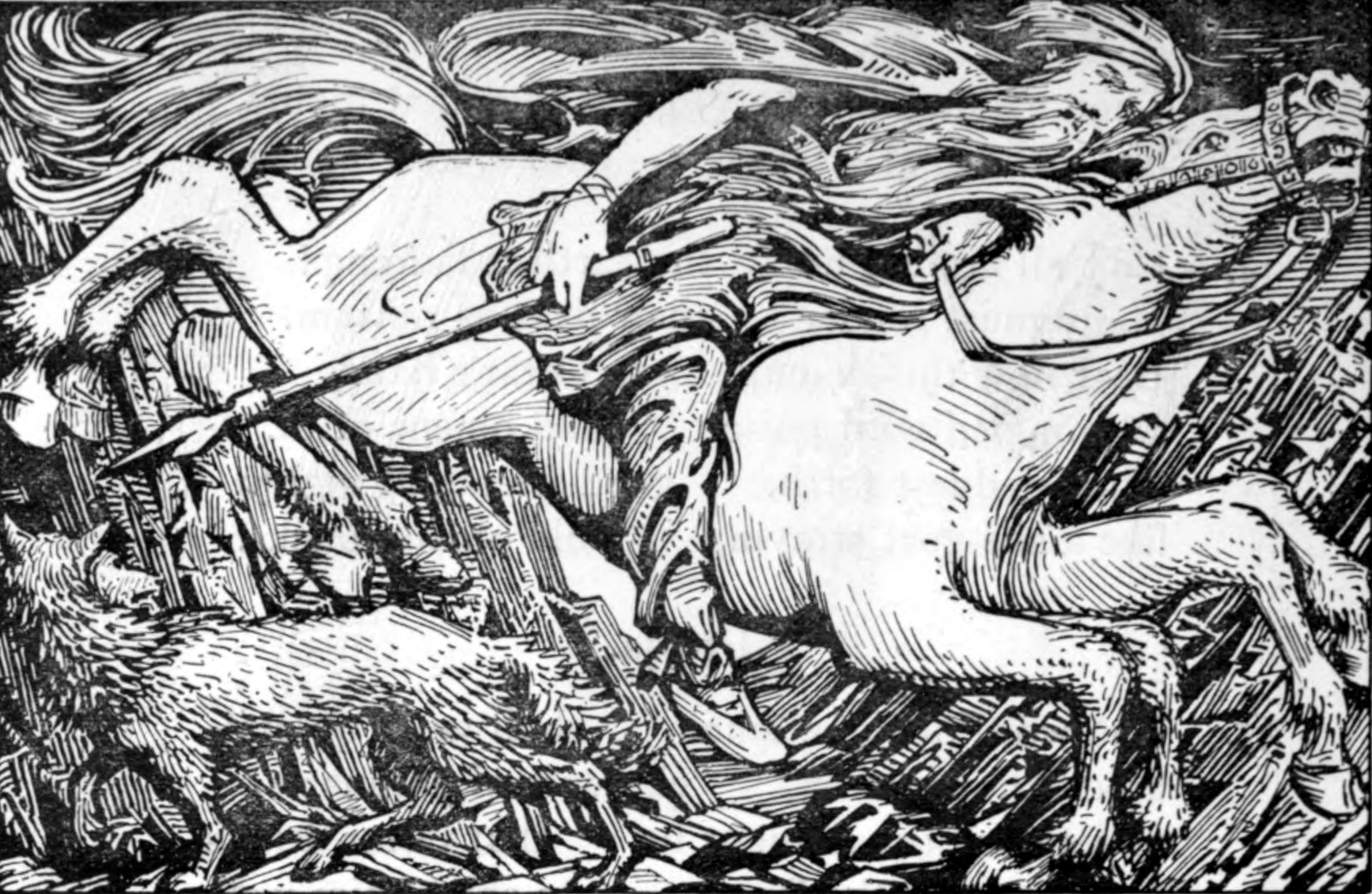
"Odin Rides to Hel" (1908) by W. G. Collingwood

Hel (Old Norse: [ˈhel]) is an afterlife location in Norse mythology and paganism. It is ruled over by a being of the same name, Hel. In late Icelandic sources, varying descriptions of Hel are given and various figures are described as being buried with items that will facilitate their journey to Hel after their death. In the Poetic Edda, Brynhildr's trip to Hel after her death is described and Odin, while alive, also visits Hel upon his horse Sleipnir. In the Prose Edda, Baldr goes to Hel on his death and subsequently Hermóðr uses Sleipnir to attempt to retrieve him.

== Etymology ==
The Old Norse feminine proper noun Hel is identical to the name of the entity that presides over the realm. The word has cognates in all branches of the Germanic languages, including Old English hell (and thus Modern English hell), Old Frisian helle, Old Saxon hellia, Old High German hella, and Gothic 𐌷𐌰𐌻𐌾𐌰. All forms ultimately derive from the reconstructed Proto-Germanic feminine noun *haljō ('concealed place, the underworld'). In turn, the Proto-Germanic form derives from the o-grade form of the Proto-Indo-European root *kel-, *kol-: 'to cover, conceal, save'.

The term is etymologically related to Modern English hall and therefore also Valhalla, an afterlife 'hall of the slain' in Norse Mythology. Hall and its numerous Germanic cognates derive from Proto-Germanic *hallō 'covered place, hall', from Proto-Indo-European *kol-.

Related early Germanic terms and concepts include Proto-Germanic *halja-rūnō(n), a feminine compound noun, and *halja-wītjan, a neutral compound noun. This form is reconstructed from the Latinized Gothic plural noun *haliurunnae (attested by Jordanes; according to philologist Vladimir Orel, meaning 'witches'), Old English helle-rúne ('sorceress, necromancer', according to Orel), and Old High German helli-rūna 'magic'. The compound is composed of two elements: *haljō and *rūnō, the Proto-Germanic precursor to Modern English rune. The second element in the Gothic haliurunnae may however instead be an agent noun from the verb rinnan ("to run, go"), which would make its literal meaning "one who travels to the netherworld".

Proto-Germanic *halja-wītjan is reconstructed from Old Norse hel-víti 'hell', Old English helle-wíte 'hell-torment, hell', Old Saxon helli-wīti 'hell', and the Middle High German feminine noun helle-wīze. The compound is a compound of *haljō (discussed above) and *wītjan (reconstructed from forms such as Old English witt 'right mind, wits', Old Saxon gewit 'understanding', and Gothic un-witi 'foolishness, understanding').

== Attestations ==
=== Poetic Edda ===
In reference to Hel, in the poem Völuspá, a völva states that Hel will play an important role in Ragnarök. The völva states that a crowing "sooty-red cock from the halls of Hel" is one of three cocks that will signal one of the beginning events of Ragnarök. The other two are Fjalar in Jotunheim and Gullinkambi in Valhalla.

In Grímnismál stanza 31, Hel is listed as existing beneath one of the three roots of the world tree Yggdrasil. One of the other two leads to the frost jötnar and the third to Mankind. In Guðrúnarkviða I, as Herborg tells of her grief in having prepared funeral arrangements for various members of her family, her children and her husbands, described it as "arranging their journey to Hel".

In the short poem Helreið Brynhildar, Hel is directly referenced as a location in the title, translating to "Brynhild's Hel-Ride". While riding along a road on the border of Hel in a lavish cart (the cart her corpse was burnt within), Brynhildr encounters a dead gýgr at a burial mound belonging to her. This results in a heated exchange, during which Brynhildr tells of her life.

In Baldrs draumar, Odin rides to the edge of Hel to investigate nightmares that Baldr has had. He uses a spell to bring to life the corpse of a völva. Odin introduces himself under a false name and pretense and asks for information from the völva relating to Baldr's dreams. The völva reluctantly proceeds to produce prophecies regarding the events of Ragnarök.

The poem gives some information regarding the geographic location of Hel in parallel to the description in the Prose Edda, which may be related to the fact that it was not included in the Codex Regius but is instead a later addition. Niflhel is mentioned as being just outside Hel. The bloody Garmr makes an appearance, encountering Odin on Odin's ride to Hel. Odin continues down the road and approaches Hel, which is described as the "high hall of Hel." There he proceeds to the grave of the völva near the eastern doors where the descriptions of Hel end.

=== Prose Edda ===
In the Prose Edda, more detailed information is given about the location, including a detailed account of a venture to the region after the death of the god Baldr. Snorri's descriptions of Hel in the Prose Edda are not corroborated outside Baldrs draumar, which does not appear in the original Codex Regius but is a later addition often included with modern editions of the Poetic Edda.

==== Gylfaginning ====
In the book Gylfaginning, Hel is introduced in chapter 3 as a location where "evil men" go upon death, and into Niflhel. The chapter further details that Hel is in the ninth of the Nine Worlds.

In chapter 34, Hel, the being is introduced. Snorri writes that Hel was cast down into Hel by Odin who "made her ruler over Nine Worlds". Snorri further writes that there Hel is located in Niflheim. Here it is related that she could give out lodging and items to those sent to her that have died of disease or old age. A very large dwelling is described as existing in Niflheim owned by Hel with huge walls and gates. The within of this place is called Éljúðnir, where Hel is described as having a servant, a slave and various possessions.

At the end of chapter 49, the death of Baldr and Nanna is described. Hermóðr, described as Baldr's brother in this source, sets out for Hel on horseback to retrieve the deceased Baldr. To enter Hel, Hermóðr rides for nine nights through "valleys so deep and dark that he saw nothing" until he arrives at the river Gjöll ("Noisy") and the Gjöll bridge. The bridge is described as having a roof made of shining gold. Hermóðr then proceeds to cross it. Hermóðr encounters Móðguð, who is the guard of the bridge ("Furious Battler").

Móðguð speaks to Hermóðr and comments that the bridge echoes beneath him more than the entire party of five people who had just passed. This is a reference to Baldr, Nanna and those that were burnt in their funeral pyre passing over the bridge on death. Móðguð also says that the dead in Hel appear as a different color than the living and tells him that to get to Hel he must go "down and to the North" where he would find the Road to Hel.

Continuing along the Road to Hel, Hermóðr encounters the Gates of Hel. Hermóðr remounts and spurs Sleipnir, and the two bound far over it. Hermóðr proceeds further beyond the gates for some distance before arriving at the hall, dismounting and entering. There Hermóðr sees Baldr sitting in a "seat of honor" and Hermóðr spends a night in Hel. The following day, Hermóðr presses Hel, the being, to allow Baldr to leave. Hel gives him an offer and then Baldr leads him out of the hall. Baldr then gives Hermóðr various gifts from Nanna and himself to bring from Hel to the living Æsir. Hermóðr then retraces his path back to the land of the living. Hel's offer fails and in chapter 50, Loki is blamed for Baldr remaining in Hel.

In chapter 53, Hel is mentioned a final time in the Prose Edda. Here, Höðr and Baldr are mentioned as returning from Hel in a post-Ragnarök world:

Því næst koma þar Baldr ok Höðr frá Heljar, setjask þá allir samt ok talask við ok minnask á rúnar sínar ok rœða of tíðindi þau er fyrrum höfðu verit, of Miðgarðsorm ok um Fenrisúlf. - Eysteinn Björnsson's edition

"After that Baldr shall come thither, and Hödr, from Hel; then all shall sit down together and hold speech with one another, and call to mind their secret wisdom, and speak of those happenings which have been before: of the Midgard Serpent and of Fenris-Wolf." - Brodeur's translation

=== Gesta Danorum ===
Book I of Gesta Danorum contains an account of what has often been interpreted as a trip to Hel. While having dinner, King Hadingus is visited by a woman bearing stalks of hemlock who asks him if he knows where such fresh herbs grow in winter. Hadingus wants to know; so the woman muffles him with her cloak, pulls him into the ground, and they vanish. Saxo reasons that the gods wished for Hadingus to visit in the flesh where he will go when he dies.

The two penetrate a dark and misty cloud, and then continue along a path worn from heavy use over the ages. The two see men wearing rich-looking robes, and nobles wearing purple. Passing them, they finally reach sunny regions where the herbs the woman presented Hadingus grow.

Hadingus and the woman continue until they arrived at a river of blue-black water that is fast-moving, full of rapids, and filled with various weapons. They cross the bridge, and see two "strongly-matched" armies meeting. Hadingus asks the woman about their identity, and she responds that they are men that have met their death by sword, and that they present an everlasting display of their destruction while attempting to equal the activity of their past lives.

Moving forward, the two encounter a wall that they cannot find a way over. The woman attempts to leap over it, but despite her slender and wrinkled body, cannot. The woman removes the head of a cock that she was carrying and throws it over the wall. The bird crows immediately; it has returned to life. Hadingus returns to his wife, and foils a threat by pirates.

== Theories ==
Hilda Ellis Davidson, writing on Snorri's unique description of Hel in his Prose Edda, states that "it seems likely that Snorri's account of the underworld is chiefly his own work" and that the idea that the dead entering Hel who have died of sickness and old age may have been an attempt on Snorri's part to reconcile the tradition with his description of Valhalla, citing that "the one detailed account of Hel" that Snorri gives is that of Baldr entering Hel without dying of old age or sickness. Davidson writes that Snorri was potentially using a "rich source" unknown to us for his description of Hel, though it may not have told him very much about the location beyond that it was a hall and that Snorri's description of Hel may at times be influenced by Christian teachings about the after-life.

== See also ==
- Helreginn, a jötunn whose name means "ruler over Hel"
- Náströnd
- Hekla
- Death in Norse paganism

== Bibliography ==
- Byock, Jesse (Trans.) (2006). The Prose Edda. Penguin Classics. ISBN 0-14-044755-5.
- Watkins, Calvert (2000). The American Heritage Dictionary of Indo-European Roots. Houghton Mifflin Company. ISBN 0-395-98610-9
- Davidson, Hilda Ellis. Fisher, Peter (Trans.) (1998). Saxo Grammaticus: The History of the Danes, Books I-IX : I. English Text; II. Commentary. D.S. Brewer. ISBN 0-85991-502-6.
- Davidson, Hilda (1968). The Road to Hel: A Study of the Conception of the Dead in Old Norse Literature. ISBN 0-8371-0070-4.
- Larrington, Carolyne (Trans.) (1999). The Poetic Edda. Oxford World's Classics. ISBN 0-19-283946-2
- Orel, Vladimir (2003). A Handbook of Germanic Etymology. Brill. ISBN 9004128751
