= Urðarbrunnr =

Mythological spring

The trio of norns at the well Urðarbrunnr as depicted in Fredrik Sander's 1893 translation of the Poetic Edda. Wood engraving by L. B. Hansen.

Urðarbrunnr (Old Norse "Wellspring of Urðr"; either referring to a Germanic concept of fate—urðr—or the norn named Urðr) is a spring or well in Norse mythology. Urðarbrunnr is attested in the Poetic Edda, compiled in the 13th century from earlier traditional sources, and the Prose Edda, written in the 13th century by Snorri Sturluson. In both sources, the wellspring lies beneath the world tree Yggdrasil, and is associated with a trio of norns (Urðr, Verðandi, and Skuld). In the Prose Edda, Urðarbrunnr is cited as one of three wellsprings existing beneath three roots of Yggdrasil that reach into three distant, different lands; the other two wellsprings being Hvergelmir, located beneath a root in Niflheim, and Mímisbrunnr, located beneath a root near the home of the frost jötnar. Scholarly theory and speculation surrounds the wellspring.

== Attestations ==
Urðarbrunnr is attested in the following works:

=== Poetic Edda ===
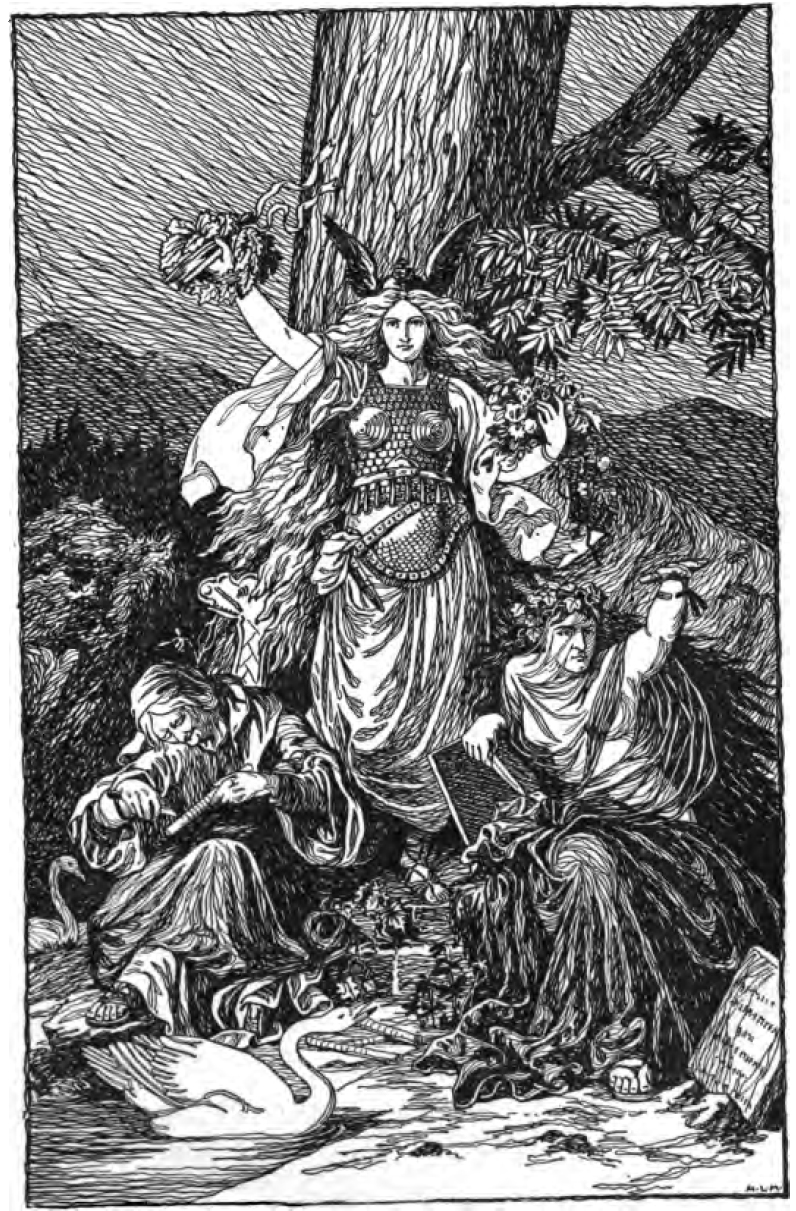
"The Norns" (1901) by Karl Ehrenberg.

In the Poetic Edda, Urðarbrunnr is mentioned in stanzas 19 and 20 of the poem Völuspá, and stanza 112 of the poem Hávamál. In stanza 19 of Völuspá, Urðarbrunnr is described as being located beneath Yggdrasil, and that Yggdrasil, an ever-green ash-tree, is covered with white mud or loam. Stanza 20 describes that three norns (Urðr, Verðandi, and Skuld) "come from" the well, here described as a "lake", and that this trio of norns then "set down laws, they chose lives, for the sons of men the fates of men."

Stanza 112 of Hávamál has been the matter of much debate and is considered unclear, having been referred to as "mysterious", "obscure and much-debated". Benjamin Thorpe translates the stanza as:

Time 'tis to discourse from the preacher's chair.
By the well of Urd I silent sat,
I saw and meditated, I listened to men's words.

=== Prose Edda ===
In the Prose Edda, Urðarbrunnr is attested in Gylfaginning (chapters 15, 16, and the beginning of chapter 17), and twice in Skáldskaparmál.

==== Gylfaginning ====
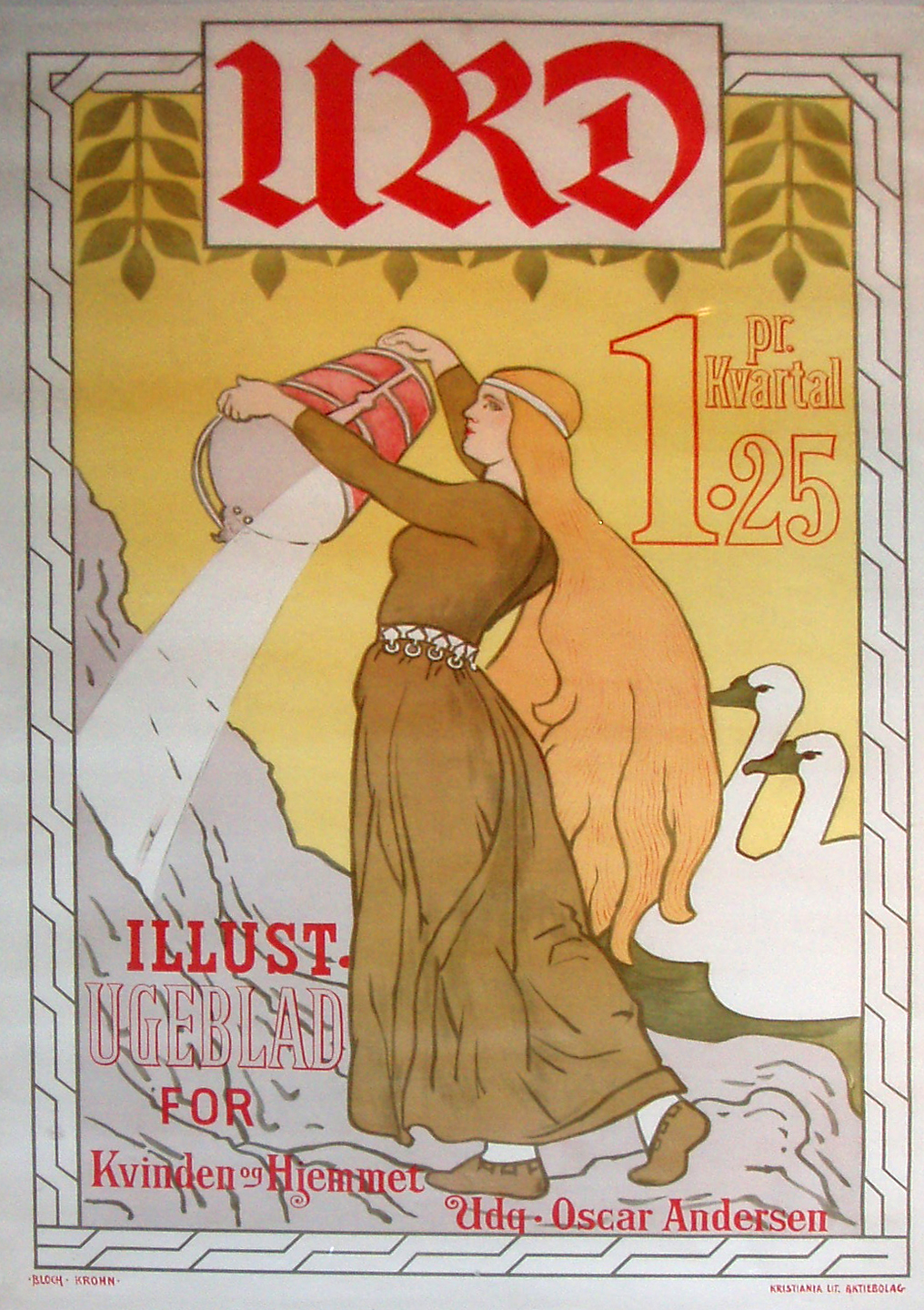
A poster for the Norwegian women's magazine Urd by Andreas Bloch and Olaf Krohn.

In chapter 15 of Gylfaginning, a book of the Prose Edda, the throned figure of Just-As-High tells Gangleri (described as King Gylfi in disguise) about Yggdrasil and its roots. Just-As-High describes three roots that support Yggdrasil that stretch a great distance. The third root is located "among the Æsir", "extends to heaven" and, beneath it, is the "very holy" Urðarbrunnr. Just-As-High details that, every day, the gods ride over the bridge Bifröst to hold court at the well.

High provides more information regarding the wellspring in chapter 16. High says that there are many beautiful places in heaven, and "everywhere there is divine protection around it." There, a beautiful hall stands under the ash (Yggdrasil) near the wellspring (Urðarbrunnr), and from this hall come "three maidens" whose names are Urðr, Verðandi, and Skuld. The maidens shape the lives of men, and "we call them norns". High goes on to describe that there are other norns, and their nature.

Further into chapter 16, High states that norns that dwell by Urðarbrunnr take water from the wellspring and mud that lies around it, and pour it over the Yggdrasil so that its branches do not decay or rot. The water is described as so holy that anything that enters the wellspring will become "as white as the membrane called the skin that lies round the inside of the eggshell." High then quotes stanza 19 of Völuspá, and states that two swans feed from the wellspring, from which all other swans descend. Chapter 17 starts off with Gangleri asking what other "chief centres" exist outside of Urðarbrunnr.

==== Skáldskaparmál ====
Two sections of the book Skáldskaparmál reference Urðarbrunnr. The first reference is in section 49, where a fragment of a work by the 10th century skald Kormákr Ögmundarson is recited in explaining how "Odin's fire" is a kenning for a sword. The passage reads "A sword is Odin's fire, as Kormak said: Battle raged when the feeder of Grid's steed [wolf], he who waged war, advanced with ringing Gaut [Odin's] fire." and that Urðr "rose from the wellspring."

Urðarbrunnr is mentioned a second time in section 52 of Skáldskaparmál, this time associated with Christ. The section states that early skalds once referred to Christ in relation to Urðarbrunnr and Rome, and quotes the late 10th century skald Eilífr Goðrúnarson, who states that "thus has the powerful king of Rome increased his realm with lands of heath-land divinities [giants; i.e. heathen lands]" and that Christ is said to have his throne south of Urðarbrunnr.

== Theories ==
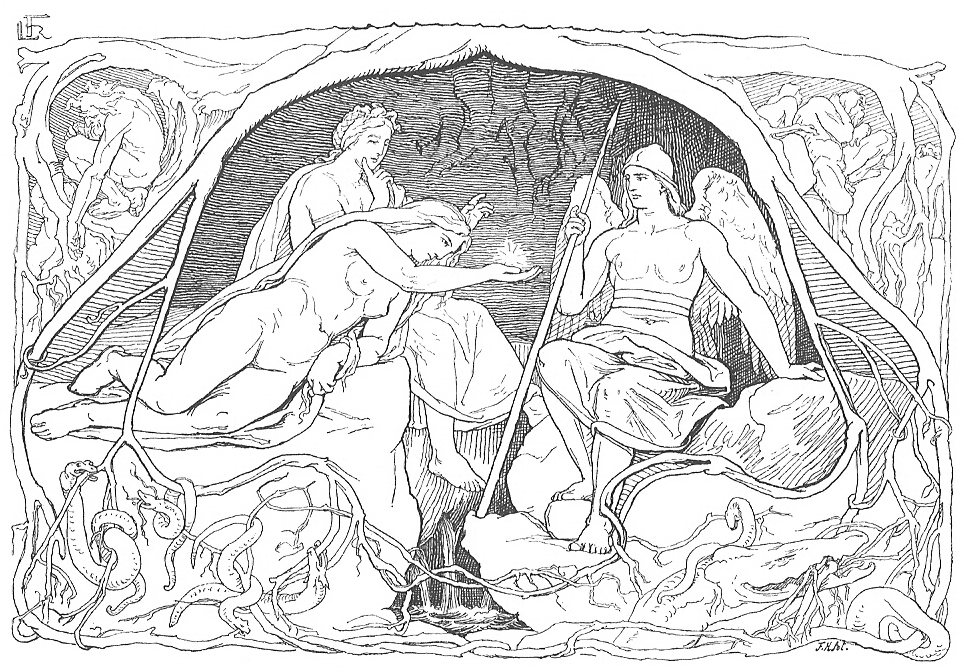
Three norns at Urðarbrunnr (1895) by Lorenz Frølich.

=== Temple at Uppsala ===
Parallels have been pointed out between the description of Urðarbrunnr at the base of the world tree Yggdrasil and Christian medieval chronicler Adam of Bremen's account of a wellspring at the base of a sacred tree at the Temple at Uppsala, Sweden, found in his 11th century work Gesta Hammaburgensis ecclesiae pontificum.

=== Eilífr Goðrúnarson ===
Eilífr Goðrúnarson's Christianity-influenced account of Urðarbrunnr (section 52 of Skáldskaparmál) associates the wellspring with the south and Rome. Theories have been proposed that this description may have some relation to notions of the Jordan River due to phonetic and typological similarities perceived by Eilífr, though there may be no other causative connection. Eilífr is otherwise known as a pagan skald, and this selection has been theorized as describing that, due to directly associating Christ with the wellspring, Christ had taken over responsibility of providence or fate.

== See also ==
- Mímisbrunnr
- Hvergelmir
- Wetlands and islands in Germanic paganism
