= Codex Scardensis =

Codex Scardensis or Skarðsbók postulasagna (Reykjavík, Stofnun Árna Magnússonar, SÁM 1 4to) is a large Icelandic manuscript containing Old Norse-Icelandic sagas of the apostles. It is, along with Flateyjarbók, one of the largest 14th century manuscripts produced in Iceland. The manuscript was written in c.1360 at the house of canons regular at Helgafell for Ormr Snorrason. From 1401 to 1807 it was housed at the church in Skarð. From 1827 until 1890 it was considered lost, with its printed edition being based on copies made in the 18th century. The manuscript returned to Iceland in 1965 after being purchased at Sotheby's in London by a consortium of Icelandic banks.

== Contents ==
As catalogued at Handrit.is, the manuscript contains the following texts:

- Tíundargerð á Skarðsströnd 1507-1523 (1r-1r)
- Máldagi kirkjunnar á Skarði á Skarðsströnd 1533 (1r-1r)
- Péturs saga postula (1v-27v)
- Páls saga postula (27v-36r)
- Andrés saga postula (36v-39v)
- Tveggja postula saga Jóns og Jakobs (40r-81v)
- Tómas saga postula (82r-85v)
- Filippus saga postula (85v-86ra)
- Jakobs saga postula (86ra-86rb)
- Barthólómeus saga postula (86rb-88v)
- Matthías saga postula (88v-89r)
- Tveggja postula saga Símonar og Júdasar (89r-92r)
- Mattheus saga postula (92r-94v)
- Máldagi kirkjunnar á Skarði 1401 (94vb-95ra)

The first two and final entries are later additions to the manuscript. A large part of the text (folios 1-81) appears to be based on manuscripts made not much earlier than Codex Scardensis itself. Tveggja postula saga Jóns og Jakobs, for example, is copied from AM 239 fol. which is only a few years older than Codex Scardensis. The texts later in the manuscript appear, on orthographic and stylistic evidence, to be based on older works. These stay closer to their Latin exemplars, whereas the younger texts add in extra material.

== History of ownership ==
Codex Scardensis was likely written in around 1360 at the monastery at Helgafell for Ormr Snorrason, a lawman and chief who inherited the estate of Skarð in 1322. Folio 94v. of the manuscript contains a note which records that in 1401 Ormr Snorrason "gave and delivered" the manuscript to the church at Skarð. However, a document from 1397 notes that the ownership of the manuscript was split between the church at Skarð and a "resident farmer". Ormr Snorrason's donation in 1401 appears to have been of his share of the manuscript.

Árni Magnússon wanted to purchase the manuscript but was unable to, despite the owners allowing him to gather other manuscripts and fragments from their collections. He was, however, allowed to borrow the manuscript from 1710 to 1712, during which time it was copied by one of his scribes. These copies (AM 628 4to, AM 631 4to and AM 636 4to) formed the basis of Carl Richard Unger's edition of the sagas of the apostles.

The last time the manuscript was mentioned in the inventories of Skarð church was in 1807. In 1827 it was recorded that "The Lives of the Apostles on vellum are now not to be found." The codex reappears on record in 1836, when Thomas Thorpe offered it for sale in London. Nothing is known about the manuscript's whereabouts between 1807 and 1836, but Benedikz has suggested that it may have left Skarð "as a peace-offering to Magnús Stephensen".

The codex was bought from Thorpe in November 1836 by the private book-collector Sir Thomas Phillipps. Phillipps produced a catalogue of the 23,837 manuscripts in his collection. Only 50 copies of this were printed, and it was through this that the Codex Scardensis's location became known to the world of Old Norse scholarship again.

On Phillipps' death in 1872, his manuscript collection passed to his daughter Katherine and her husband John Fenwick. From 1886 John Fenwick began auctioning off books in the collection, but the Codex Scardensis was never offered for sale. In 1938 Thirlstaine House, where the collection was held, was requisitioned by the British Government as part of the war effort. The manuscripts were stored in crates in the cellars of the house and subsequently purchased for £100,000 by the antiquarian firm of William H Robinson Ltd in 1945. This firm auctioned off the collection until it closed in 1956. The Codex Scardensis was still unsold and passed into the private collection of Lionel and Philip Robinson.

Desmond Slay of the University of Wales, Aberystwyth was asked by Jón Helgason to locate the manuscript. Slay did so, and in 1960 published a facsimile edition of the text.

On 30 November 1965 the manuscript was bought for Iceland by a group of Icelandic banks organised by Dr Jóhannes Nordal. This consortium arranged for the codex to be bought by Mr T. Hannas, a Norwegian bookseller living in London, so as not attract attention and lead to the manuscript's price being increased by a bidding war.

== Description of manuscript ==
The manuscript originally had 95 leaves, but one leaf following folio 63 is missing. There are thirteenth gatherings which were rearranged when the manuscript was rebound. Folio 45, the largest, measures 41.6 by 27.4 cm, which is as large at Flateyjarbók. The text is written in two columns of usually 38 lines.

The manuscript features the work of seven scribes. Only one of these, the priest Eilífr who wrote part of the tithe account in 1401, is known by name. The majority of the text was written by a scribe referred to as H Hel02 with contributions by H Hel11. A short passage was written by H Hel03. The other three scribes are responsible for the later additions at the beginning and end of the manuscript.
