= Helreginn =

Norse mythical character

Helreginn (Old Norse: [ˈhelˌreɣenː], "Ruler over Hel" or "Hell-power") is a jötunn in Norse Mythology.

== Name ==
The Old Norse name Helreginn has been translated as 'Ruler over Hel', or 'Hel-power'. Rudolf Simek comments that the name is unusual, reasoning that it is uncommon for a jötunn to be directly associated with "the underworld."

== Attestation ==
Helreginn is listed in the þulur section of Skáldskaparmál. Other than the name, no additional information about the figure is provided.

== See also ==
- Hel, daughter of Loki, ruler over the location of the same name
