= Móðguðr =

Norse mythical character

In Norse mythology, Móðguðr (Old Norse: [ˈmoːðˌɡuðz̠], "Furious Battler"; also Modgud) refers to the female guardian (tutelary deity) of the bridge over the river Gjöll ("Noisy"), Gjallarbrú. She allowed the newly dead to use the bridge to cross from one side of the river Gjöll to the other if the soul stated their name and business and possibly in turn prevented the dead beyond the river from crossing back over Gjöll into the lands of the living.

== Gylfaginning ==
In the book Gylfaginning at the end of Chapter 49, the death of Baldr and Nanna is described. Hermóðr, described as Baldr's brother in this source, sets out to Hel on horseback to retrieve the deceased Baldr. To enter Hel, Hermóðr rides for nine nights through "valleys so deep and dark that he saw nothing" until he arrives at the river Gjöll ("Noisy") and its bridge, Gjallarbrú, which is guarded by Móðguðr. The bridge is described as having a roof made of shining gold. Hermóðr crosses it before being challenged at the far end by Móðguðr.

Móðguðr speaks to Hermóðr and comments that the bridge echoes beneath him more than the entire party of five people who had just passed. This is a reference to Baldr, Nanna, and those that were burnt on their funeral pyre passing over the bridge upon death. Móðguðr also says that the dead in Hel appear as a different color from the living and tells him that to get to Hel he must go "down and to the North" where he would find the Road to Hel.
