= Hvergelmir =

Spring in Norse mythology

Hvergelmir (Old Norse "bubbling boiling spring") is an important primal wellspring in Norse mythology. Hvergelmir is attested in the Poetic Edda, compiled in the 13th century from earlier traditional sources, and the Prose Edda, written in the 13th century by Snorri Sturluson. In the Poetic Edda, Hvergelmir is mentioned in a single stanza, which details that it is the location where liquid from the antlers of the stag Eikþyrnir flow, and that the spring, "whence all waters rise", is the source of numerous rivers. The Prose Edda repeats this information and adds that the spring is located in Niflheim, that it is one of the three major springs at the primary roots of the cosmic tree Yggdrasil (the other two are Urðarbrunnr and Mímisbrunnr), and that within the spring are a vast amount of snakes and the dragon Níðhöggr.

== Attestations ==
Hvergelmir is attested in the following works:

=== Poetic Edda ===
Hvergelmir receives a single mention in the Poetic Edda, found in the poem Grímnismál:

Eikthyrnir the hart is called, that stands o'er Odin's hall, and bites from Lærad's branches; from his horns fall drops into Hvergelmir, whence all waters rise:

This stanza is followed by three stanzas consisting mainly of the names of 42 rivers. Some of these rivers lead to the dwelling of the gods (such as Gömul and Geirvimul), while at least two (Gjöll and Leipt), reach to Hel.

=== Prose Edda ===
Hvergelmir is mentioned several times in the Prose Edda. In Gylfaginning, Just-as-High explains that the spring Hvergelmir is located in the foggy realm of Niflheim: "It was many ages before the earth was created that Niflheim was made, and in its midst lies a spring called Hvergelmir, and from it flows the rivers called Svol, Gunnthra, Fiorm, Fimbulthul, Slidr and Hrid, Sylg and Ylg, Vid, Leiptr; Gioll is next to Hell-gates."

Later in Gylfaginning, Just-as-High describes the central tree Yggdrasil. Just-as-High says that three roots of the tree support it and "extend very, very far" and that the third of these three roots extends over Niflheim. Beneath this root, says Just-as-High, is the spring Hvergelmir, and that the base of the root is gnawed on by the dragon Níðhöggr. Additionally, High says that Hvergelmir contains not only Níðhöggr but also so many snakes that "no tongue can enumerate them".

The spring is mentioned a third time in Gylfaginning where High recounts its source: the stag Eikþyrnir stands on top of the afterlife hall Valhalla feeding branches of Yggdrasil, and from the stag's antlers drips great amounts of liquid down into Hvergelmir. High tallies 26 rivers here.

Hvergelmir is mentioned a final time in the Prose Edda where Third discusses the unpleasantries of Náströnd. Third notes that Hvergelmir is yet worse than the venom-filled Náströnd because—by way of quoting a portion of a stanza from the Poetic Edda poem Völuspá—"There Nidhogg torments the bodies of the dead".

== See also ==
- Urðarbrunnr
- Mímisbrunnr
