= Niflheim =

Realm of primordial ice and cold in Norse mythology

In Norse cosmology, Niflheim or Niflheimr (Old Norse: [ˈnivlˌhɛimz̠]; "World of Mist", literally "Home of Mist") is a location which sometimes overlaps with the notions of Niflhel and Hel. The name Niflheimr appears only in two extant sources: Gylfaginning and the much-debated Hrafnagaldr Óðins.

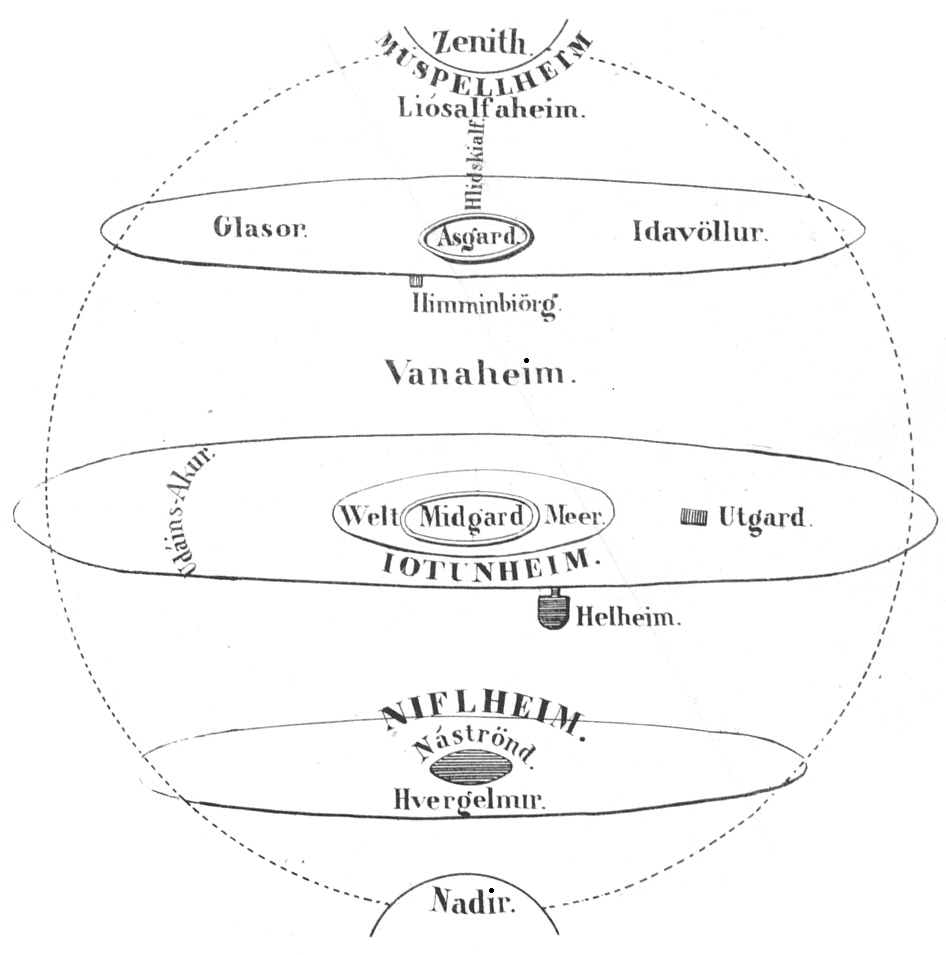
Henry Wheaton's illustration of Norse cosmology (1831)

Niflheim was primarily a realm of primordial ice and cold, with the frozen rivers of Élivágar and the well of Hvergelmir, from which come all the rivers.

According to Gylfaginning, Niflheim was the first of the two primordial realms to emanate out of Ginnungagap, the other one being Muspelheim, the realm of fire. Between these two realms of cold and heat, creation began when its waters mixed with the heat of Muspelheim to form a "creating steam". Later, it became the abode of Hel, a goddess daughter of Loki, and the afterlife for her subjects, those who did not die a heroic or notable death.

== Etymology ==
Nifl ("mist"; whence the Icelandic nifl) is a cognate to the Old English nifol ("dark, gloomy"), (Middle) Dutch nevel, Old High German nebul ("fog") and Ancient Greek νεφέλη, [ne.pʰé.lɛː], ("cloud").

== Gylfaginning ==
In Gylfaginning by Snorri Sturluson, Gylfi, the king of ancient Scandinavia, receives an education in Norse mythology from Odin in the guise of three men. Gylfi learns from Odin (as Jafnhárr) that Niflheimr was the first world to be created after Muspelheim:

It was many ages before the earth was shaped that the Mist-World [Niflheimr] was made; and midmost within it lies the well that is called Hvergelmir, from which spring the rivers called Svöl, Gunnthrá, Fjörm, Fimbulthul, Slídr and Hríd, Sylgr and Ylgr, Víd, Leiptr; Gjöll is hard by Hel-gates.

Odin (as Þriði) further tells Gylfi that it was when the ice from Niflheimr met the flames from Muspelheimr that creation began and Ymir was formed:

Just as cold arose out of Niflheim, and all terrible things, so also all that looked toward Múspellheim became hot and glowing; but Ginnungagap was as mild as windless air, and when the breath of heat met the rime, so that it melted and dripped, life was quickened from the yeast-drops, by the power of that which sent the heat, and became a man's form. And that man is named Ymir, but the Rime-Giants call him Aurgelmir; ...

In relation to the world tree Yggdrasill, Jafnhárr (Odin) tells Gylfi that frost jötnar is located under the second root, where Ginnungagap (Yawning Void) once was:

The Ash is greatest of all trees and best: its limbs spread out over all the world and stand above heaven. Three roots of the tree uphold it and stand exceeding broad: one is among the Æsir; another among the Rime-Giants, in that place where aforetime was the Yawning Void; the third stands over Niflheim, and under that root is Hvergelmir, and Nídhöggr gnaws the root from below.

Gylfi is furthermore informed that when Loki had engendered Hel, she was cast into Niflheimr by Odin:

Hel he cast into Niflheim, and gave to her power over nine worlds, to apportion all abodes among those that were sent to her: that is, men dead of sickness or of old age. She has great possessions there; her walls are exceeding high and her gates great.

Hel thus became the mistress of the world of those dead in disease and old age. This is the only instance in which Niflheim and Hel are equated (the Poetic Edda mentions Hel but doesn't say anything about Niflheim). However, there is some confusion in the different versions of the manuscript, with some of them saying Niflheim where others say Niflhel (the lowest level of Hel). Thus in the passage about the last destination of the jötunn who was killed by Thor after he had built Asgard:

Now that the Æsir saw surely that the hill-giant was come thither, they did not regard their oaths reverently, but called on Thor, who came as quickly. And straightway the hammer Mjöllnir was raised aloft; he paid the wright's wage, and not with the sun and the moon. Nay, he even denied him dwelling in Jötunheim, and struck but the one first blow, so that his skull was burst into small crumbs, and sent him down below under Niflhel [Niflheim].

== Hrafnagaldr Óðins ==
In Hrafnagaldr Óðins, there is a brief mention of Niflheimr as a location in the North, towards which the sun (Alfr's illuminator) chased the night as it rose:

Riso raknar, rann álfraudull, nordr at niflheim nióla sótti; upp nam ár Giöll Úlfrúnar nidr, hornþytvalldr Himinbiarga.	The powers rose, the Alfs' illuminator northwards before Niflheim chased the night. Up Argjöll ran Ulfrun's son, the mighty hornblower, of heaven's heights.

== See also ==
- Æsir
- Aurgelmir
- Ginnungagap
- Gjöll
- Hel
- Hvergelmir
- Níðhöggr
- Niflhel
- Rime-Giants
- List of Germanic deities
