= Ginnungagap =

Primordial void mentioned in the Gylfaginning

In Norse mythology, Ginnungagap (old Norse: [ˈɡinːoŋɡɑˌɡɑp]; "gaping abyss", "yawning void") is the primordial, magical void mentioned in three poems from the Poetic Edda and the Gylfaginning, the Eddaic text recording Norse cosmogony.

== Etymology ==
Ginnunga- is usually interpreted as deriving from a verb meaning "gape" or "yawn", but no such word occurs in Old Norse except in verse 3 of the Eddic poem "Vǫluspá", "gap var ginnunga", which may be a play on the term.

In her edition of the poem, Ursula Dronke suggested it was borrowed from Old High German ginunga, as the term Múspell is believed to have been borrowed from Old High German. An alternative etymology links the ginn- prefix with that found in terms with a sacral meaning, such as ginn-heilagr, ginn-regin (both referring to the gods) and ginn-runa (referring to the runes), thus interpreting Ginnungagap as signifying a "magical (and creative) power-filled space".

== Creation ==
Ginnungagap appears as the primordial void in the Norse creation account. The Gylfaginning states:

Ginnungagap, the Yawning Void ... which faced toward the northern quarter, became filled with heaviness, and masses of ice and rime, and from within, drizzling rain and gusts; but the southern part of the Yawning Void was lighted by those sparks and glowing masses which flew out of Múspellheim

In the Völuspá, a supernaturally long-lived völva who was raised by jötnar tells the story of how Odin and his two brothers created the world from Ginnungagap.

== Geographic rationalization ==
Scandinavian cartographers from the early 15th century attempted to localize or identify Ginnungagap as a real geographic location from which the creation myth derived. A fragment from a 15th-century (pre-Columbus) Old Norse encyclopedic text entitled Gripla (Little Compendium) places Ginnungagap between Greenland and Vinland:

Now is to be told what lies opposite Greenland, out from the bay, which was before named: Furdustrandir hight a land; there are so strong frosts that it is not habitable, so far as one knows; south from thence is Helluland, which is called Skrellingsland; from thence it is not far to Vinland the Good, which some think goes out from Africa; between Vinland and Greenland is Ginnungagap, which flows from the sea called Mare oceanum, and surrounds the whole earth.

A scholion in a 15th-century manuscript of Adam of Bremen's Gesta Hammaburgensis Ecclesiae Pontificum similarly refers to Ghimmendegop as the Norse word for the abyss in the far north.

Later, the 17th-century Icelandic bishop Guðbrandur Thorlaksson also used the name Ginnungegap to refer to a narrow body of water, possibly the Davis Strait, separating the southern tip of Greenland from Estotelandia, pars America extrema, probably Baffin Island.

== See also ==
- Abyss (religion)
- Chaos (cosmogony)
- Plane (esotericism)
- Void (astronomy)
