= Gylfaginning =

Part of the Prose Edda

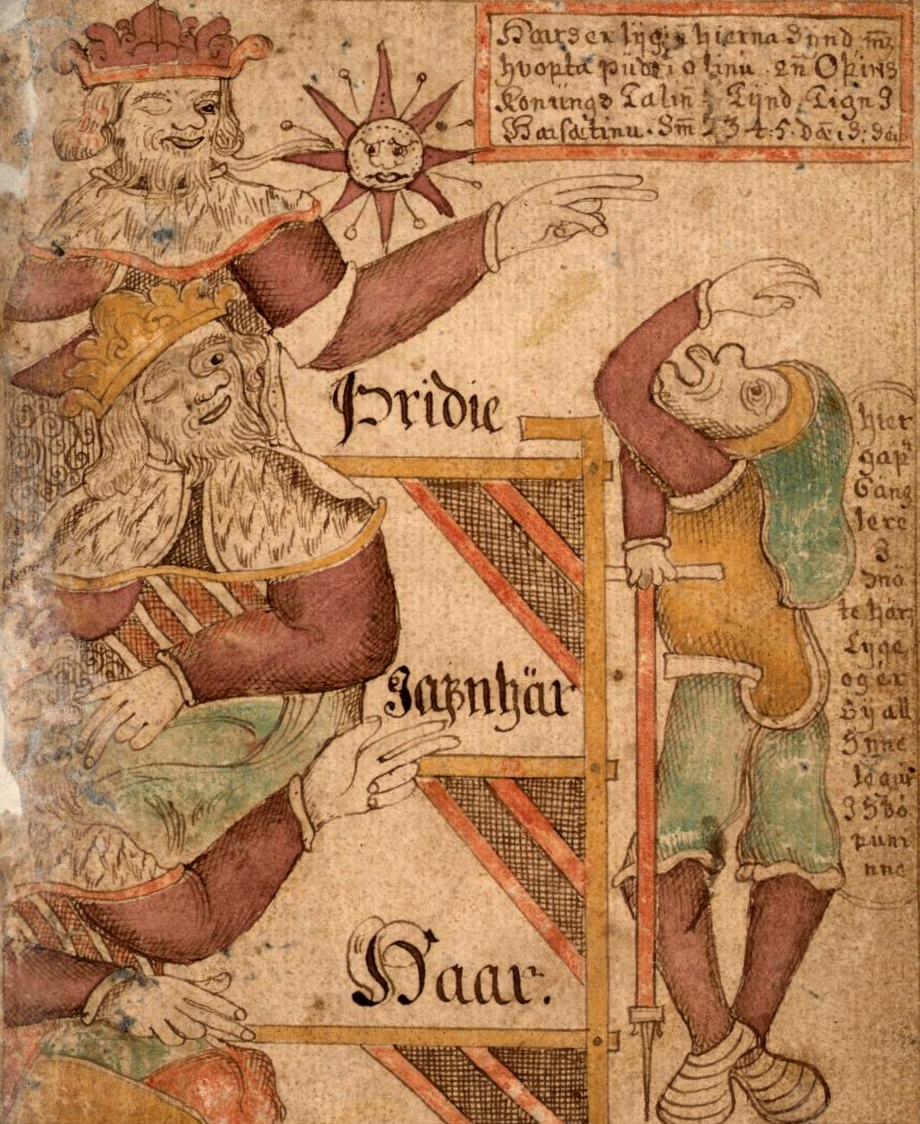
Gylfi is tricked in an illustration from Icelandic Manuscript, SÁM 66

Gylfaginning (Old Norse: 'The Beguiling of Gylfi' or 'The Deluding of Gylfi'; 13th century Old Norse pronunciation [ˈɟʏlvaˌɟɪnːɪŋɡ]) is the first main part of the 13th-century Prose Edda, after the initial Prologue. The Gylfaginning takes the form of a dialogue between a Swedish King Gylfi and three men on thrones in Asgard called High, Just-As-High, and Third. Gylfi asks many questions of the three men on the history and future of the Æsir. The creation and eventual destruction of the world are described, as are many other aspects of Norse mythology. While the Gylfaginning never makes it explicit, the three are often presumed to be guises of Odin.

The second part of the Prose Edda is the Skáldskaparmál and the third Háttatal. The work is often attributed to or considered to have been compiled by Snorri Sturluson.

== Summary ==
The Gylfaginning tells the story of Gylfi, a king of "the land that men now call Sweden". He is tricked by one of the goddesses of the Æsir, and wonders if all Æsir use magic and tricks for their will to be done. To find out more, he takes the "path of the serpent" to journey to Asgard; the Æsir realize he is coming and prepare illusions to deceive him. Gylfi finds a great palace. Inside the palace, he encounters a man who asks Gylfi's name; Gylfi introduces himself as Gangleri. "Gangleri" then is taken to the king of the palace and comes upon three men on thrones: High, Just-As-High, and Third (Hár, Jafnhár, and Þriði).

Gangleri is then challenged to show his wisdom by asking questions, as is the custom in many sagas. Each question made to High, Just-As-High, and Third is about an aspect of the Norse mythology or its gods, and also about the creation and destruction of the world (Ragnarök). In the end, the palace and its people vanish, presumably as they were illusions to begin with. Gylfi is left standing on empty ground. Gylfi then returns to his nation and retells the tales he was told.

The author may have used this narrative device as a means to safely document a vanishing and largely oral tradition within a Christian context. In the same way, a line continues the idea raised in the Prologue that Asgard is another name for the city of Troy, another way to make stories of the Norse gods acceptable as describing a lost ancient history rather than rival deities to the Christian god. The account can be downplayed as just stories for the devout, but Snorri Sturluson trusts that most listeners would be won over by the account of the three men of the vanished world of the Æsir. The very final section of the Gylfaginning is also related to the Trojan connection to the Æsir, but is discarded as a later addition written by a separate author than the rest of the work by some scholars. According to this final section, the human descendants of the Trojans took on the same names told in the stories that had been told to Gylfi, presumably to endow themselves with additional authority.

The work as a whole is around 20,000 words.
