= 10 Year Anniversary: Live in Reykjavík =

Live album by Skálmöld

Live album by Skálmöld
- Released: 20 October 2020
- Recorded: 21 December 2019
- Venue: Gamla bíó, Reykjavík
- Genre: Pagan metal, Viking metal
- Length: 108:44
- Language: Icelandic
- Label: Napalm Records

Skálmöld chronology
Sorgir (2018)	10 Year Anniversary: Live in Reykjavík (2020)	Ýdalir (2023)

10 Year Anniversary: Live in Reykjavík is a live album and concert video by Icelandic Viking metal band Skálmöld, released on 20 October 2020 by Napalm Records. It was recorded during a farewell concert, held in Reykjavík ahead of Skálmöld's hiatus from the beginning of 2020.

== Background and recording ==
Skálmöld was formed by six Icelandic musicians in 2009. It received international attention for its debut album Baldur (2010), which was followed by four more studio albums, all themed around Norse mythology and Icelandic folklore, a live album with a symphony orchestra, and several international tours. In 2019, the band decided to go on a hiatus at the start of 2020. As a temporary farewell, it held three concerts at the Gamla bíó in Reykjavík in December 2019.

10 Year Anniversary: Live in Reykjavík was recorded on 21 December 2019, during the second of the three shows. The concert was broadcast live on the Icelandic radio station Rás 2. There were no modifications or re-recording of any of the material. The audio files of the recording were sent to the record company the day after the show.

== Release ==
After two postponements due to complications with the manufacturing, Napalm Records released 10 Year Anniversary: Live in Reykjavík on CD, vinyl, DVD and Blu-ray on 20 October 2020. The Blu-ray includes a 15 minutes long documentary film about Skálmöld. The tracks "Niðavellir", "Að hausti", "Árás" and "Að vetri" were released on the Internet with live music videos.

== Reception ==
Angela of Metal.de compared 10 Year Anniversary: Live in Reykjavík to Skáldöld's previous live album, Skálmöld & Sinfóníuhljómsveit Íslands (2013), which was recorded with the Iceland Symphony Orchestra, and said the new album displays the band "at its purest". She said it reflects the experience of Skálmöld's regular concerts, with the audience singing along in Icelandic throughout the songs, a unique feature of shows in the band's home country. She said the setlist is a good selection from the band's five studio albums and should satisfy both old and new listeners, only missing the track "Loki" which otherwise often is part of the live sets. Carl Fisher of Games, Brrraaains & A Head-Banging Life wrote that the quality of the audio production sometimes makes it sound like a studio album, while at the same time, the audience can be heard clearly. Folk-metal.nl highlighted the audio production, and wrote that although the "cold brooding air" from the studio album Sorgir (2018) is not reproduced live, that is weighed up by the participation from the audience, which almost functions as a choir.

== Track listing ==
Track listing adapted from Bandcamp.

No.	Title	Meaning	Length
1.	"Heima"	Home	2:49
2.	"Árás"	Attack	5:53
3.	"Að hausti"	In autumn	5:10
4.	"Fenrisúlfur"	Fenrir	6:22
5.	"Narfi"	Narfi	5:10
6.	"Midgarðsormur"	Midgard Serpent	5:24
7.	"Niflheimur"	Niflheim	6:53
8.	"Með fuglum"	With birds	6:22
9.	"Mara"	Mare	8:38
10.	"Móri"	Móri	6:26
11.	"Niðavellir"	Niðavellir	5:05
12.	"Að vetri"	In winter	5:31
13.	"Dauði"	Death	9:14
14.	"Gleipnir"	Gleipnir	4:04
15.	"Með jötnum"	With jötnar	10:09
16.	"Kvaðning"	The Call	9:34
Total length:			108:44

== Personnel ==
Skálmöld

- Baldur Ragnarsson – guitar, vocals
- Björgvin Sigurðsson – vocals, guitar
- Gunnar Ben – keyboard, vocals, oboe
- Jón Geir Jóhannsson – drums, vocals
- Snæbjörn Ragnarsson – bass, vocals
- Þráinn Árni Baldvinsson – guitar, vocals
