= Wheel World =

- Developer: Messhof
- Publisher: Annapurna Interactive
- Director: Mark Essen
- Designer: Michael Savage-Benoist
- Programmer: Sam Loeschen
- Artists: Dann Beeson; Dan Hunter
- Composers: Johnny Jewel; Joon; Orion
- Engine: Unity
- Platforms: Microsoft Windows; Linux; PlayStation 5; Xbox Series X/S
- Release: Windows, PlayStation 5, Xbox Series X/S; July 23, 2025; Linux; September 9, 2025
- Genres: Adventure, racing
- Mode: Single-player

Wheel World is an adventure racing game developed by Messhof and published by Annapurna Interactive. The game was released on July 23, 2025, for Windows, PlayStation 5 and Xbox Series X and Series S.

== Gameplay ==
Wheel World is an adventure video game played from a third-person perspective. In the game, the player assumes control of Kat, a cyclist "chosen by ancient cycling spirits" who must collect legendary bicycle parts to perform a ritual that saves the world. Players can explore several large regions while riding on Kat's bike, and encounter various non-playable characters. As they progress, they will earn "Rep" through challenging other characters in a race, and performing difficult tricks with Kat's bike. The bike can also be extensively customized with various parts, which can further improve its performance while navigating difficult terrain.

== Development ==
The game was developed by Messhof, which is most known for creating Nidhogg, its sequel, and Flywrench. Wheel World is a significant departure from the studio's past games, as it is its first 3D game and its first game with a proper narrative. It is also Messhof's first game with a publisher and the first to be produced with a significantly larger team. The game was announced in June 2023 by Annapurna Interactive as Ghost Bike. Originally, the game had a more somber tone, and its narrative focused on a cyclist who was transported to a "cycling Valhalla" after being killed in a road traffic accident (See ghost bike). However, as the studio refined its gameplay systems, it also changed the game's tone to be more lighthearted and decided to change the game's title to reflect its new focus. According to Mark Essen, the founder of Messhof, Wheel World is about finding the "joy and freedom of living around bikes," though the story retains its supernatural elements. Technical lead Sam Loeschen also described the game as "a goofy, irreverent, and kind of chill experience".

The game features an original soundtrack from the indie label Italians Do It Better.

== Reception ==
Reception

Aggregate scores
Aggregator	Score
Metacritic	PC: 71/100
OpenCritic	64% recommend (Note: Based on 45 reviews)

Review score
Publication	Score
Eurogamer	4/5

Wheel World received "mixed or average" reviews from critics, according to review aggregator website Metacritic. Fellow review aggregator OpenCritic assessed that the game received fair approval, being recommended by 64% of critics.

Eurogamer awarded the title 4/5 stars, calling it "lovely" and "focused". Polygon praised the title's "well-executed cycling" mechanics. Rock Paper Shotgun described the game as "easy-going" and praised the game's use of music and soundtrack. They noted how incomparable the game was from Messhof's previous titles, such as Nidhogg.

=== Awards ===
The game was nominated for Racing Game of the Year at the 29th Annual D.I.C.E. Awards.

== See also ==
- Season: A Letter to the Future
