= Nidhogg (disambiguation) =

Nidhogg is a Germanic dragon in Norse mythology.

Nidhogg may also refer to:

- Nidhogg (video game)
  - Nidhogg 2, sequel of above
- Nidhogg (Devil May Cry), a demon in Devil May Cry 5
