= Skálmöld & Sinfóníuhljómsveit Íslands =

Live album and video by Skálmöld and the Iceland Symphony Orchestra

Live album by Skálmöld and the Iceland Symphony Orchestra
- Released: 18 December 2013
- Recorded: 28–30 November 2013
- Venue: Eldborg, Harpa, Reykjavík
- Language: Icelandic
- Label: Sena

Skálmöld & Sinfóníuhljómsveit Íslands is a live album and concert video by Icelandic metal band Skálmöld and the Iceland Symphony Orchestra, released on 18 December 2013. The song material is from Skálmöld's first two albums, arranged for orchestra by Haraldur V. Sveinbjörnsson and performed during three concerts at Harpa in Reykjavík. The concerts received the Icelandic Music Award for Music Event of the Year. The album was nominated for Album of the Year – Rock and sold more than 7,000 copies.

== Background and recording ==
The band Skálmöld formed in Reykjavík, Iceland, in 2009 and combine heavy metal music inspired by bands such as early Metallica, Iron Maiden, Anthrax and Slayer with conventions from Icelandic music and poetry traditions. The lyrics are in Icelandic and draw heavily from Norse mythology. Everybody in the band is a member of the neopagan organisation Ásatrúarfélagið.

After releasing the studio albums Baldur (2010) and Börn Loka (2012) and receiving attention for their live performances, Skálmöld were offered to collaborate with the Iceland Symphony Orchestra, which for several years had worked with bands and artists of disparate backgrounds. The composer Haraldur V. Sveinbjörnsson created orchestral arrangements of songs from Skálmöld's two albums to be performed by the band and symphony orchestra in Eldborg, the main auditorium of the concert hall Harpa in Reykjavík. The collaboration also involved the Karlakór Reykjavíkur (lit. 'Men's choir of Reykjavík'), the school choir of Kársnesskóli and the choir Hymnodía. Bernharður Wilkinson was conductor. As part of the Iceland Symphony Orchestra's educational work, teenagers from primary schools in the Reykjavík region attended the final rehearsals on the morning of 28 November 2013, before three sold-out concerts were held on 28, 29 and 30 November 2013. The concerts were recorded and filmed so they could be released on CD and DVD as Skálmöld & Sinfóníuhljómsveit Íslands.

== Release ==
The live video of the song "Hel", which features Edda Tegeder Óskarsdóttir of the band Angist as guest vocalist, was released on YouTube on 6 December 2013. The record label Sena released the CD and DVD of Skálmöld & Sinfóníuhljómsveit Íslands on 18 December 2013, two days after the initially announced date. The album was launched with an event at a record store in the Reykjavík shopping centre Kringlan where Skálmöld's members signed records.

== Reception ==
Benedikt Bóas of Morgunblaðið praised the album, rating it five out of five, but thought the video was less impressive and rated it three and a half out of five. He had been at the live performances, which he called "some of the best concerts in Icelandic history", and described the album as "great, absolutely magnificent really" and "probably one of the best concert albums in Icelandic history". He wrote that the record company had rushed to get the release out for Christmas, which he thought shows in how the accompanying booklet has little content. He described the video as poorly edited and the camerawork as uninteresting, as it relies only on tripods and handheld cameras, with no crane shots.

The concerts in Eldborg received the Icelandic Music Award for Music Event of the Year. Skálmöld and the Icelandic Symphony Orchestra were jointly nominated for Live Performer of the Year, but lost to Skálmöld who were also nominated on their own. Skálmöld & Sinfóníuhljómsveit Íslands was nominated for Album of the Year – Rock, losing to In the Eye of the Storm by Mono Town.

Skálmöld & Sinfóníuhljómsveit Íslands was initially released in 4,700 copies which sold out in four days. In January 2016, the album received an Icelandic platinum certificate, which meant it had sold more than 7,000 copies. Skálmöld simultaneously received gold certificates — 3,500 records sold — for the studio albums Baldur and Með vættum (2014), and celebrated this by holding concerts in Iceland in February and March 2016. Skálmöld and the Iceland Symphony Orchestra repeated their collaboration when they held four concerts in Eldborg in August 2018.

== Track listing ==
All lyrics are written by Snæbjörn Ragnarsson; all music is composed by Skálmöld.

Album
No.	Title	Meaning	Length
1.	"Innrás"	Invasion	3:53
2.	"Árás"	Attack	6:40
3.	"Gleipnir"	Gleipnir	4:05
4.	"Narfi"	Narfi	4:24
5.	"Sorg"	Grief	5:33
6.	"Loki"	Loki	12:35
7.	"Fenrisúlfur"	Fenrir	6:17
8.	"Miðgarðsormur"	Midgard Serpent	5:36
9.	"Hel" (featuring Edda Tegeder)	Hel	6:12
10.	"Kvaðning"	The Call	11:22
11.	"Baldur"	Baldur	12:25

Video
No.	Title	Meaning	Length
1.	"Heima"	Home	3:05
2.	"Innrás"	Invasion	3:53
3.	"Árás"	Attack	6:40
4.	"Gleipnir"	Gleipnir	4:05
5.	"Upprisa"	Rebirth	7:12
6.	"Sleipnir"	Sleipnir	6:36
7.	"Narfi"	Narfi	4:24
8.	"Hefnd" (featuring Aðalbjörn Tryggvason)	Vengeance	5:31
9.	"Sorg"	Grief	5:33
10.	"Loki"	Loki	12:36
11.	"Fenrisúlfur"	Fenrir	6:17
12.	"Miðgarðsormur"	Midgard Serpent	5:38
13.	"Dauði"	Death	6:48
14.	"Valhöll"	Valhalla	5:31
15.	"Hel" (featuring Edda Tegeder)	Hel	6:12
16.	"Kvaðning"	The Call	11:22
17.	"Baldur"	Baldur	12:25
