= Ýdalir (album) =

2023 studio album by Skálmöld

Studio album by Skálmöld
- Released: 18 August 2023
- Genre: Folk metal, Viking metal
- Length: 46:08
- Language: Icelandic
- Label: Napalm Records

Skálmöld chronology
10 Year Anniversary: Live in Reykjavík (2020)	Ýdalir (2023)

Ýdalir is the sixth studio album by the Icelandic heavy metal band Skálmöld, released on 18 August 2023 through Napalm Records.

== Background ==
The Icelandic heavy metal Skálmöld formed in 2009 and released five studio albums before announcing a hiatus in 2020. Ýdalir marked the band's return after three years and was its first studio album in five years. The production of Ýdalir received a grant of 700,000 Icelandic krónur from the Music Recording Fund (Icelandic: Hljóðritasjóður) of Iceland's Ministry of Education, Science and Culture.

== Music and lyrics ==
Like Skálmöld's other albums, the lyrics are themed around Norse mythology. The songs on Ýdalir are especially indebted to the poem Grímnismál from the Poetic Edda.

== Release ==
The first album single "Ratatoskur" was released with a lyric video on 20 June 2023. The second single "Verðandi" was released with a music video on 18 July 2023. "Ýdalir" was released as a single with a video of Skálmöld performing the song on 15 August 2023.

Ýdalir was released by Napalm Records on 18 August 2023. Starting with two concerts in Iceland on 15 and 16 September 2023, Skálmöld plan to go on a European tour where they perform the album as one cohesive show, followed by some of their older material after an intermission.

== Reception ==
Louisa Esch of Metal.de wrote that Ýdalir places emphasis on narrative, atmosphere and melodic guitar riffs, and diverges from previous Skálmöld albums by including spoken parts, comparing this to Wardruna's recitations of poetry. Esch wrote that Skálmöld here appears "more serious and mystical than ever" and although it is far from the band's best album, it shows that Skálmöld still can surprise listeners.

== Track listing ==
The track listing is adapted from Bandcamp.

No.	Title	Meaning	Length
1.	"Ýr"	Yew	1:33
2.	"Ýdalir"	Ýdalir	5:06
3.	"Urður"	Urðr	4:26
4.	"Ratatoskur"	Ratatoskr	5:00
5.	"Verðandi"	Verðandi	6:09
6.	"Veðurfölnir"	Veðrfölnir	4:21
7.	"Skuld"	Skuld	4:02
8.	"Níðhöggur" (featuring Baldvin Kristinn Baldvinsson)	Níðhöggr	5:03
9.	"Ullur"	Ullr	10:59
Total length:			46:08

== Personnel ==
Skálmöld

- Baldur Ragnarsson – guitar, vocals
- Björgvin Sigurðsson – lead vocals, guitar
- Gunnar Ben – keyboard, vocals, oboe
- Jón Geir Jóhannsson – drums, vocals
- Snæbjörn Ragnarsson – bass, vocals
- Þráinn Árni Baldvinsson – lead guitar, vocals
