= Vögguvísur Yggdrasils =

Studio album by Skálmöld
- Released: 30 September 2016
- Genres: Viking metal, folk metal
- Language: Icelandic
- Label: Napalm Records

Skálmöld chronology
Með vættum (2014)	Vögguvísur Yggdrasils (2016)	Sorgir (2018)

Vögguvísur Yggdrasils ("Yggdrasil's lullabies" in Icelandic) is the fourth full-length studio album by the Icelandic viking/folk metal band Skálmöld, released on September 30, 2016 via Napalm Records.

== Track listing ==
All tracks are written by Skálmöld.

No.	Title	Translation	Length
1.	"Múspell"	Muspelheim	5:25
2.	"Niflheimur"	Niflheim	5:05
3.	"Niðavellir"	Nidavellir	4:45
4.	"Miðgarður"	Midgard	4:40
5.	"Útgarður"	Utgard	4:30
6.	"Álfheimur"	Alfheim	6:40
7.	"Ásgarður"	Asgard	5:45
8.	"Helheimur"	Helheim	3:05
9.	"Vanaheimur"	Vanaheim	9:20
Total length:			49:15

Limited edition bonus CD
No.	Title	Translation	Length
10.	"Drink" (Alestorm cover)		3:54
11.	"Inní mér syngur vitleysingur" (Sigur Rós cover)	A fool is singing inside me	3:57
12.	"Nattfödd" (Finntroll cover)	Night-born	4:15
13.	"Lazer Eyes" (Thor cover)		3:05
14.	"Helreið afa"	Grandpa's hell-ride	5:12
15.	"Upprisa" (live)	Resurrection	7:15
16.	"Hefnd" (live)	Vengeance	5:34
17.	"Dauði" (live)	Death	6:54
Total length:			40:06
