= Ratatoskr =

Norse mythical animal

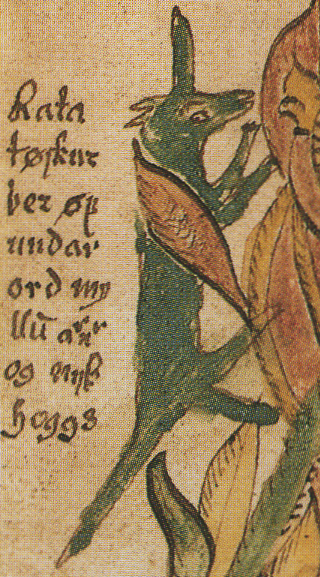
A 17th century Icelandic manuscript depicting Ratatoskr. Although unexplained in the manuscript and not otherwise attested, in this image Ratatoskr bears a horn or tusk.

In Norse mythology, Ratatoskr (Old Norse, generally considered to mean "drill-tooth" or "bore-tooth") is a squirrel who runs up and down the world tree Yggdrasil to carry messages between the eagles perched atop it and the dragon Níðhöggr who dwells beneath one of the three roots of the tree. Ratatoskr is attested in the Poetic Edda, compiled in the 13th century from earlier traditional sources, and the Prose Edda, written in the 13th century by Snorri Sturluson.

== Etymology ==
The name Ratatoskr contains two elements: rata- and -toskr. The element toskr is generally held to mean "tusk". Guðbrandur Vigfússon theorized that the rati- element means "the traveller". He says that the name of the legendary drill Rati may feature the same term. According to Vigfússon, Ratatoskr means "tusk the traveller" or "the climber tusk."

Sophus Bugge theorized that the name Ratatoskr is a loanword from Old English meaning "Rat-tooth." Bugge's basis hinges on the fact that the -toskr element of the compound does not appear anywhere else in Old Norse. Bugge proposed that the -toskr element is a reformation of the Old English word tūsc (Old Frisian tusk) and, in turn, that the element Rata- represents Old English ræt ("rat").

According to Albert Sturtevant, "[as] far as the element Rata- is concerned, Bugge's hypothesis has no valid foundation in view of the fact that the [Old Norse] word Rata (gen. form of Rati*) is used in Háv[amál] (106, 1) to signify the instrument which Odin employed for boring his way through the rocks in quest of the poet's mead [...]" and that "Rati* must then be considered a native [Old Norse] word meaning "The Borer, Gnawer" [...]".

Sturtevant says that Bugge's theory regarding the element -toskr may appear to be supported by the fact that the word does not appear elsewhere in Old Norse. However, Sturtevant says that the Old Norse proper name Tunne (derived from Proto-Norse *Tunþē) refers to "a person who is characterized as having some peculiar sort of tooth" and theorizes a Proto-Germanic form of -toskr. Sturtevant concludes that "the fact that the [Old Norse] word occurs only in the name Rata-toskr is no valid evidence against this assumption, for there are many [Old Norse] hapax legomena of native origin, as is attested by the equivalents in the Mod[ern] Scandinavian dialects." Modern scholars have accepted this etymology, listing the name Ratatoskr as meaning "drill-tooth" (Jesse Byock, Andy Orchard, Rudolf Simek) or "bore-tooth" (John Lindow).

== Attestations ==
In the Poetic Edda poem Grímnismál, the god Odin (disguised as Grímnir) says that Ratatoskr runs up and down Yggdrasil bringing messages between the eagle perched atop it and Níðhöggr below it:

Old Norse: Ratatoskr heitir íkorni, er renna skal at aski Yggrdrasils; arnar orð hann skal ofan bera ok segia Níðhöggvi niðr.	Benjamin Thorpe translation: Ratatösk is the squirrel named, who has run in Yggdrasil's ash; he from above the eagle's words must carry, and beneath the Nidhögg repeat.	Henry Adams Bellows translation: Ratatosk is the squirrel who there shall run On the ash-tree Yggdrasil; From above the words of the eagle he bears, And tells them to Nithhogg beneath.

Ratatoskr is described in the Prose Edda's Gylfaginning's chapter 16, in which High states that

An eagle sits at the top of the ash, and it has knowledge of many things. Between its eyes sits the hawk called Vedrfolnir [...]. The squirrel called Ratatosk [...] runs up and down the ash. He tells slanderous gossip, provoking the eagle and Nidhogg.

== Theories ==
According to Rudolf Simek, "the squirrel probably only represents an embellishing detail to the mythological picture of the world-ash in Grímnismál". Hilda Ellis Davidson, describing the world tree, states the squirrel is said to gnaw at it—furthering a continual destruction and re-growth cycle, and posits the tree symbolizes ever-changing existence. John Lindow points out that Yggdrasil is described as rotting on one side and as being chewed on by four harts and Níðhöggr, and that, according to the account in Gylfaginning, it also bears verbal hostility in the fauna it supports. Lindow adds that "in the sagas, a person who helps stir up or keep feuds alive by ferrying words of malice between the participants is seldom one of high status, which may explain the assignment of this role in the mythology to a relatively insignificant animal".

Richard W. Thorington Jr. and Katie Ferrell theorize that "the role of Ratatosk probably derived from the habit of European tree squirrels (Sciurus vulgaris) to give a scolding alarm call in response to danger. It takes little imagination for you to think that the squirrel is saying nasty things about you."

== In popular culture ==
Ratatoskr is a character in Marvel Comics, first introduced by Ryan North in The Unbeatable Squirrel Girl. Ratatoskr is depicted as female and possesses shapeshifting abilities and the ability to cause discord.

In the video game La-Mulana 2, Ratatoskr is a recurring boss enemy. While initially weak, he becomes stronger and gains more abilities in subsequent battles. Within the game's mythos, Ratatoskr is an illusion created by Hræsvelgr, who is trapped in the Eternal Prison.

Ratatoskas (sic) are characters in Katherine Rundell's novel Impossible Creatures.

Ratatoskr appears as a playable character in Smite.

Ratatoskr is an original character from the mobile game Fire Emblem Heroes and is a lead character in the 8th book of the story.

Ratatoskr is featured as a prominent side character in the 2022 video game God of War Ragnarök. A ghostly version of Ratatoskr appears in the preceding title God of War as an ally of Atreus.

Songs about Ratatoskr are featured on Ýdalir, the sixth album of Icelandic viking metal band Skálmöld and on Fimbulvinter, the third album of Swedish viking metal band Brothers of Metal.

In One Piece, Ragnir, Loki's Mjölnir-inspired Warhammer, can take the form of a squirrel which is the result of consuming a Zoan Devil Fruit based on Ratatoskr.
