= Forsen =

Swedish Twitch streamer

- Born: 16 December 1990 (age 35); Umeå, Sweden
- Occupation: Twitch streamer
- Organization: GG Talent Group
- Partner: Nina Wagner

Twitch information
- Channel: forsen
- Years active: 2011–present
- Genre: Gaming
- Games: StarCraft II; Hearthstone; PUBG: Battlegrounds; Minecraft; Counter-Strike: Global Offensive
- Followers: 1.8 million
- Last updated: 17 January 2025

Hans Eli Sebastian Fors (born 16 December 1990), known by the pseudonym Forsen, is a Swedish streamer. He initially gained popularity for participating in StarCraft II professional competitions, later competing in Hearthstone, and is known for streaming a variety of popular games on Twitch. He is also known for his rowdy fanbase, who call themselves "Forsen Boys" or "Forsen Bajs" and have had a hand in popularizing a number of Internet memes. Since December 2018, Forsen has had over one million followers on Twitch, and as of June 2024, he has more than 1.7 million followers.

== Esports career ==
=== StarCraft II ===
In 2011, Forsen won first place in the E-Sport SM May Qualifier and was the runner-up in the E-Sport SM October Qualifier, earning a total of 3,500 Swedish krona ($382.50) and qualifying for the Swedish National Championships in StarCraft II. In 2012, Forsen garnered attention by advancing to the final group stage of the 2012 DreamHack Stockholm StarCraft II tournament.

=== Hearthstone ===
Forsen won his first Hearthstone tournament in the May 2015 HTC Invitational, and won a Play it Cool streaming marathon in October 2015, achieving the highest rank among the competitors after 24 hours of play. In 2015, Forsen was one of the top four Hearthstone streamers, streaming to up to 45,000 viewers on his live stream on Twitch. He was known as one of the game's most skilled experts at the Miracle Rogue deck, having piloted it to achieve the highest rank in the game's ladder system on both the North American and European servers in June 2014. In 2017, after spending much of his Hearthstone career as a free agent, Forsen signed with American esports organization Cloud9 as a streamer.

== Streaming career ==
As of January 2023, Forsen has been a livestreamer on Twitch for over a decade. His stream has been lauded as "genuinely... fun and entertaining" for its tightly knit community and inside jokes, as well as for Forsen's tendency to stream "Lidl" games, a term coined by Forsen to describe games of low production value.

In February 2018, Forsen captained his four-player team to first place in a $100,000 PUBG: Battlegrounds Invitational tournament hosted by Twitch Rivals, winning $13,600. The following month, he also participated in the Darwin Project Invitational tournament. In December 2018, he achieved a personal all-time high viewer count of 80,860.

In late 2020, Forsen began a friendly rivalry with fellow streamer xQc, the pair competing to achieve the fastest time in a speedrun of Minecraft.

On 26 November 2020, Forsen received an indefinite suspension from Twitch after he displayed a GIF sent to him by a viewer displaying a sexually explicit interaction between a woman and a horse on stream. He was unbanned after a month.

On 20 April 2023, Forsen was banned again from Twitch, with no reason or ban duration given. On 24 April, he revealed that the ban was due to watching a "dubious ASMR youtube video" on stream, and that it would last for one week.

== Community ==
Forsen's stream community, known as the "Forsen Boys" or "Forsen Bajs", has gained notoriety of its own through its practice of stream sniping, especially in games like PUBG: Battlegrounds. Stream snipers in Forsen's community are noted for locating Forsen in-game and playing loud music and audio through voice chat, and represent a point of appeal for Forsen's audience. In 2018, the Darwin Project Invitational tournament was disrupted by the infiltration of a match lobby by Samme1g, a stream sniper in Forsen's community.

The community is also known for its practice of spamming in Twitch chats and the popularization of internet memes and Twitch emotes. The spread of notable emotes, such as "monkaS" and "PepeHands" (images of Pepe the Frog), have been attributed to Forsen's community on Reddit. Their references to Ugandan action-comedy film Who Killed Captain Alex? have also helped popularise the Ugandan Knuckles meme. In January 2018, a warped image of Forsen's face ("forsenE") became the most-used emote on Twitch worldwide.

Forsen's moderation of the community has been described as "permissive" and "laissez-faire", and in 2015, he distanced himself from their actions and the "Forsen Boys" label. That year, streamer Katy Coe became the target of sexual harassment from members of Forsen's community, culminating in Forsen banning links to her channel after Coe posted to Reddit denouncing the behavior. In 2017, Forsen received a 24-hour ban from Twitch after members of his community spammed racial slurs in the 2017 Awesome Games Done Quick chat room.

== Awards and nominations ==
Awards and nominations for Forsen
| Year | Ceremony | Category | Result | Ref. |
|---|---|---|---|---|
| 2021 | The Streamer Awards | Best Minecraft Streamer | Nominated | |
