= Blood Dungeon =

- Developer: Messhof
- Publisher: Messhof
- Composer: Thomas Hoey
- Platforms: PlayStation 5, Windows, Xbox Series X/S, Nintendo Switch 2
- Release: August 25, 2026
- Mode: Single-player

Blood Dungeon is a 2D platformer and shooter with roguelike-style action, developed and published by Messhof. It was released on August 25, 2026.

== Gameplay ==
Blood Dungeon is a 2D roguelike action-platformer that combines the auto-shooting style of Vampire Survivors with jumping and exploration challenges. Players earn bones during runs, which can be spent between attempts at the Bone Shop to obtain permanent upgrades. Completing quests unlocks additional weapons, upgrades, and playable characters.

== Development and release ==
Messhof is an American video game designer and artist best known for Nidhogg. The first official trailer announcing and revealing the game was released worldwide on August 25, 2026, on the same day the game was released.

== Reception ==
Reception

Aggregate scores
Aggregator	Score
Metacritic	(PC) 77/100
OpenCritic	86% recommend (Note: Based on 14 reviews)

According to the review aggregation website Metacritic, the PC version of Blood Dungeon received "mixed or average" reviews from critics. Fellow review aggregator OpenCritic assessed that the game received fair approval, being recommended by 86% of critics.
