= Náströnd =

Place in Hel in Norse belief

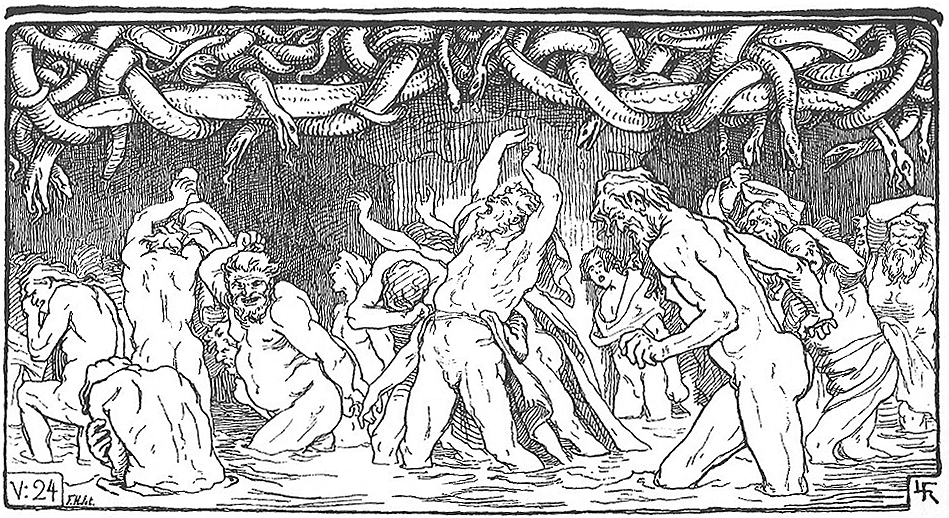
An illustration of Náströnd (1895) by Lorenz Frølich.

In Norse mythology, Náströnd ("Corpse Shore") is a place in Hel where Níðhöggr devours the dead souls of the dishonorable. It is the afterlife for those guilty of murder, and severe oath-breaking.

== Orthography ==
In the standardized Old Norse orthography, the name was spelled Nástrǫnd, which in 11th century Old West Norse was pronounced [ˈnɑːˌstrɔnd]. In Modern Icelandic the letter 'ǫ' is replaced by ö, and Náströnd is pronounced [ˈnauˌstrœnt].

== Poetic Edda ==
The Völuspá says:

Sal sá hón standa sólo fiarri, Nástrǫndu á, norðr horfa dyrr. Fello eitrdropar inn um lióra. Sá er undinn salr orma hryggiom. Sá hón þar vaða þunga strauma menn meinsvara ok morðvarga ok þannz annars glepr eyrarúno. Þar saug Níðhǫggr nái framgengna, sleit vargr vera. Vitoð ér enn, eða hvat? Völuspá 38-39, Dronke's edition	A hall she saw standing remote from the sun on Dead Body Shore. Its door looks north. There fell drops of venom in through the roof vent. That hall is woven of serpents’ spines. She saw there wading onerous streams men perjured and wolfish murderers and the one who seduces another’s close-trusted wife. There Malice Striker sucked corpses of the dead, the wolf tore men. Do you still seek to know? And what? Völuspá 38-39, Dronke's translation

== Prose Edda ==
Snorri Sturluson quotes this part of Völuspá in the Gylfaginning section of his Prose Edda. He uses the plural of the word: Nástrandir (Corpse Shores).

Á Náströndum er mikill salr ok illr, ok horfa í norðr dyrr, hann er ok ofinn allr ormahryggjum sem vandahús, en ormahöfuð öll vitu inn í húsit ok blása eitri, svá at eptir salnum renna eitrár, ok vaða þær ár eiðrofar ok morðvargar, svá sem hér segir: Sal veit ek standa sólu fjarri Náströndu á, norðr horfa dyrr. Falla eitrdropar inn of ljóra. Sá er undinn salr orma hryggjum. Skulu þar vaða þunga strauma menn meinsvara ok morðvargar. En í Hvergelmi er verst: Þar kvelr Níðhöggr nái framgengna. Gylfaginning 52, EB's edition	On Nástrand [Strand of the Dead] is a great hall and evil, and its doors face to the north: it is all woven of serpent-backs like a wattle-house; and all the snake-heads turn into the house and blow venom, so that along the hall run rivers of venom; and they who have broken oaths, and murderers, wade those rivers, even as it says here: I know a hall standing far from the sun, In Nástrand: the doors to northward are turned; Venom-drops falls down from the roof-holes; That hall is bordered with backs of serpents. There are doomed to wade the weltering streams Men that are mansworn, and they that murderers are. But it is worst in Hvergelmir: There the cursed snake tears dead men's corpses. Gylfaginning 52, Brodeur's translation

== See also ==
- Hel (being)
- Hel (realm)
- Niflheim
- Niflhel
- Niðafjöll
