= Börn Loka =

Studio album by Skálmöld
- Released: October 26, 2012
- Genre: Viking metal, folk metal
- Language: Icelandic
- Label: Napalm Records

Skálmöld chronology
Baldur (2010)	Börn Loka (2012)	Með vættum (2014)

Börn Loka (Children of Loki in Icelandic) is the second full-length album by the Icelandic Viking / folk metal band Skálmöld, released on October 26, 2012, via Napalm Records.

== Music ==
Like their debut album, Baldur, Börn Loka ("The Children of Loki") is a concept album firmly grounded in Norse mythology. Börn Loka is ostensibly about Viking outcast Hilmar Baldursson and his sister Brynhildur, and follows Hilmar's quest to provide for his sister by fighting Loki's three famous children, but it's really about Loki taking out his revenge on Baldur's children. A little more knowledge of the Eddas (particularly who Narfi and Váli are, and what happened to them) is needed to really understand Loki's motivation or Brynhildur's fate.

The ten songs depict five encounters, with a setup song and a payoff song for each. The album begins and ends with the same motif, kicking off the action, and revealing the awful truth in the end. The three eponymous monsters are each sung in a different vocal style: the wolf Fenris Úlfur screams a black metal scream, the Miðgarð Serpent Jörmundgandur is sung in a traditional Icelandic rimur style, and Hel, the goddess of death, is sung with a second death metal growl from guest vocalist Edda Tegeder of Angist. Frontman Björgvin Sigurðsson narrates Hilmar's story and provides the voice of the god.

The main character, Hilmar, was named after the son of the band's lead singer and guitarist Björgvin Sigurðsson, while his sister Brynhildur is named after Guitarist Þráinn Árni Baldvinsson's mother. Songwriter Snæbjörn likes to use names for the characters which are familiar to him and to which he has some connection.

== Track listing ==
No.	Title	Translation	Length
1.	"Óðinn"	Odin	2:11
2.	"Sleipnir"	Sleipnir	6:27
3.	"Gleipnir"	Gleipnir	4:01
4.	"Fenrisúlfur"	Fenrir	5:37
5.	"Himinhrjóður"	Himinhrjóður	2:07
6.	"Miðgarðsormur"	Midgard Serpent	5:19
7.	"Narfi"	Narfi	3:53
8.	"Hel (ft. Edda Tegeder of Angist)"	Hel	5:35
9.	"Váli"	Váli	6:02
10.	"Loki"	Loki	9:37

== Credits ==
- Björgvin Sigurðsson – vocals, guitar
- Baldur Ragnarsson – guitar, backing vocals
- Snæbjörn Ragnarsson – bass
- Þráinn Árni Baldvinsson – guitar
- Gunnar Ben – keyboards, oboe
- Jón Geir Jóhannsson – drums
- Edda Tegeder Óskarsdóttir (Angist) – guest vocals on "Hel"
