= Sléttubönd =

Icelandic traditional verse form

In traditional Icelandic poetry, sléttubönd is a type of ferskeytt, more precisely a quatrain with a strict rhyming scheme and a fixed number of syllables. It follows the standard pattern of Icelandic poetry between the late Middle Ages and the early 20th century (still frequently employed today) where two stressed syllables in each odd-numbered line alliterate with the first stressed syllable of the following line. The form's defining characteristic is that its words constitute a valid quatrain also when read in the inverse order, making sléttubönd a type of palindromic verse. Sometimes, such a reading also causes the meaning to be reversed (intentionally), see the “Dóma grundar…” example below.

In his 1882 article, “On Old Icelandic and Norwegian Poetry”, Benedict Gröndal calls sléttubönd the most “precious” of metres (the Icelandic term dýr—‘dear’—often being used to designate poetry using convoluted forms which aim for elegance but sometimes tend to be laboured.) He also states that sléttubönd is an invention of relatively recent date, “likely unknown to the older poets”. Writing in 1950, Björn K. Þórólfsson similarly asserts that the first sléttubönd quatrains are found in the rímur of Þórður Magnússon á Strjúgi, who was active in the late 16th century.

== Form ==
In the cited article, Gröndal summarizes the characteristics of the verse form as follows (p. 158):

- A sléttubönd quatrain contains 14 words, all disyllabic except that lines 1 and 3 each end in a monosyllabic word.
- All words rhyme within the quatrain, with the exception of:
  - the penultimate word of each of lines 1 and 3;
  - the first word of each of lines 2 and 4.
- The words of a quatrain thus structured can be re-ordered and read in at least 16 different ways without disrupting its alliteration scheme or syntax, while still being meaningful.

== Examples ==
=== Strict form ===
Gröndal provides the following example of sléttubönd, listing 16 possible mutations (only a few of which are shown here):

Alda rjúka gjörði grá
golnis spanga freyju
kalda búka fluttu frá
frændur Dranga eyju.

Changing only the order of the first two words of lines 1 and 3:

Rjúka alda gjörði grá
golnis spanga freyju
búka kalda fluttu frá
frændur Dranga eyju.

The first version read backwards:

Eyju Dranga frændur frá
fluttu búka kalda
freyju spanga golnis grá
gjörði rjúka alda.

Moving around most of the words:

Spanga freyju golnis grá
gjörði alda rjúka
Dranga eyju fluttu frá
frændur kalda búka.

Although thousands of sléttubönd quatrains have been written, only a few remain well-known. A highly celebrated one, and attributed to various authors, is given below. Scholars generally consider it to be the work of pastor Jón Þorgeirsson (~1597–1674), who served at Hjaltabakki in North Iceland and who was the father of bishop Steinn Jónsson. It was first printed in the 19th century, and is included in the Corpus Poeticum Boreale, printed in Oxford in 1883 (p. 418).

Read one way, the quatrain reads as praise for an honest and law-abiding man:

Dóma grundar, hvergi hann
hallar réttu máli.
Sóma stundar, aldrei ann
illu pretta táli.

Read the other way, it becomes a description of a dishonest liar:

Táli pretta illu ann,
aldrei stundar sóma.
Máli réttu hallar hann,
hvergi grundar dóma.

=== ‘Lesser’ sléttubönd ===
Björn K. Þórólfsson further specifies that to count as sléttubönd a quatrain must, at minimum:

- have an alliterative pattern where the last two feet of each odd-numbered line both alliterate with the first foot of the following line;
- rhyme the first word of line 1 with the first word of line 3.

This variant of sléttubönd is labelled “lesser“ because it fails some of the criteria laid down above (for example a disyllabic word can be replaced with two monosyllabic ones), but it retains the fundamental characteristic of being able to be read backwards. The following example is from another rímur poet, Guðmundur Andrésson. In it, he both announces his use in the ríma of the “lesser” sléttubönd form and declares himself as its initiator.

Spinna skal þó hljóða hátt
heyrðan fyrri eigi,
finna til þess þýðan þátt
þræddan banda vegi.

== Use today ==
Unlike some other traditional forms of Icelandic poetry, sléttubönd is rarely employed today. Among the best-known uses of the form in recent years (although not necessarily recognized as such) are some of the lyrics by the folk metal band Skálmöld, for example the text to the song Barnið (The Child) from the album Sorgir, where the second half is simply the first half read backwards.

The text begins:

Látið barnið fagra fá
friðinn, vofur skjótar
grátið allar. Mæður má
mæra, skottur ljótar.
…

(“Render peace to the beautiful child; Cry all, you fleet spirits; Mothers deserve praise, you foul ghosts.”)

but ends:

…
Ljótar skottur mæra má
mæður allar grátið.
Skjótar vofur friðinn fá
fagra barnið látið.

(“Foul ghosts deserve praise; Cry all, you mothers; Fleet spirits receive peace; The beautiful child is dead.”)

The meaning has therefore been completely reversed, in the manner of the “Dóma grundar…” quatrain above.
