= Messhof =

American video game designer

Mark Essen
- Other name: Messhof
- Occupations: Video game designer and artist
- Known for: Nidhogg

Mark Essen, better known as Messhof, is an American video game designer and artist best known for Nidhogg, its sequel, and Flywrench. His latest game, Blood Dungeon, was released in August 2026.

== Career ==
In college, Messhof made games with GameMaker and Microsoft Paint software. An early game, Punishment 1, began as a group assignment in an advanced, experimental class. His other early games included Wally, Bool, Booloid, Punishment 2, and Flywrench, uploaded on his website. His work was profiled in The Creators Project and the Los Angeles Museum of Contemporary Art, and shown in the New York New Museum, Toronto Museum of Contemporary Canadian Art, and Liverpool Foundation for Art and Creative Technology. He was cited by a Savannah College of Art and Design instructor as a successful example of blending arts aesthetics and video games.

Messhof developed Nidhogg, a fast-paced, side-scrolling sword fighting game between 2010 and 2014. Its first prototype, Raging Hadron, was expanded over four years to include online multiplayer, new environments, and new gameplay modes. Messhof balanced development as the sole programmer with development on other games and both teaching and student commitments in graduate school. He taught classes on intermediate game design and experimental mobile games at University of Southern California's Interactive Media & Games program. Nidhogg's production pace increased when he formed a studio, also known as Messhof, with Kristy Norindr, who found other collaborators for finishing the project. An expanded version of the game, Nidhogg 2, was illustrated by artist Toby Dixon and includes new levels, music, and weapons.

In 2023, Messhof revealed Ghost Bike, an adventure/racing game focused around cycling. The game was delayed and rebranded as Wheel World in 2024, after changes were made to its story and core gameplay features.

== Legacy ==
Messhof influenced Jonatan Söderström, co-creator of Hotline Miami.

== Games developed ==
Year	Title	Platform
2014	Nidhogg	Windows, macOS, PS4, PSVita
2015	Flywrench	Windows, macOS, PS4
2017	Nidhogg 2	Windows, macOS, PS4, Xbox One, Switch
2025	Wheel World	Windows, Linux, PS5, Xbox Series X/S
2026	Blood Dungeon	Windows, PS5, Xbox Series X/S, Nintendo Switch 2
