= Ýdalir =

Mythological location

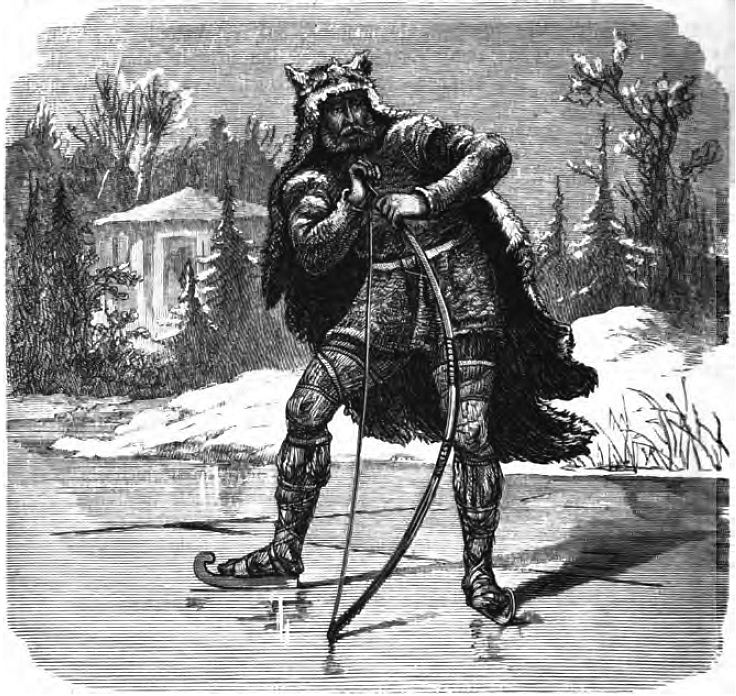
Leaning on a bow, the god Ullr stands atop a frozen lake surrounded by evergreen trees and a building (1882) by Friedrich Wilhelm Heine.

In Norse mythology, Ýdalir ("yew-dales") is a location containing a dwelling owned by the god Ullr. Ýdalir is solely attested in the Poetic Edda, compiled in the 13th century from earlier traditional sources. Scholarly theories have been proposed about the implications of the location.

== Attestations ==
Ýdalir is solely attested in stanza 5 of the poem Grímnismál (collected in the Poetic Edda), where Odin (disguised as Grímnir) tells the young Agnar that Ullr owns a dwelling in Ýdalir. The stanza reads (Ýdalir is here translated as Ydalir):

Ydalir it is called, where Ullr
has himself a dwelling made.
Alfheim the gods Frey gave
in days of yore for a tooth-gift.

== Theories ==
Discussing Ýdalir, Henry Adams Bellows comments that "the wood of the yew-tree was used for bows in the North just as it was long afterwards for England." Rudolf Simek says that "this connexion of the god with the yew-tree, of whose wood bows were made (cf. ON ýbogi 'yew bow'), has led to Ullr being seen as a bow-god." Andy Orchard comments that Ýdalir is an "aptly named dwelling-place [for the] archer-god, Ull." According to Hilda Ellis Davidson, while Valhalla "is well known because it plays so large a part in images of warfare and death," the significance of other halls in Norse mythology such as Ýdalir, and the goddess Freyja's afterlife location Fólkvangr has been lost.

Udale, located in Cromarty, Scotland, is first recorded in 1578, and is thought to derive from Old Norse y-dalr. Robert Bevan-Jones proposes a connection between veneration of Ullr and Ýdalir among the settling pagan Norse in Scotland and their bestowment of the name ydalr to the location.

== In popular culture ==
Ýdalir was probably the inspiration for the name of a bow in the 1996 Super Famicom game Fire Emblem: Genealogy of the Holy War. A legendary bow wielded by the crusader Ullr (named after the Norse god) is called Ichiibaru (Japanese: イチイバル), with "Ichii" the Japanese term for "Yew", and "baru" perhaps a loose Japanese syllabification of the English word "valley." The same term was used in the 2012 anime Symphogear. In 2013, "Ichaival" was added to an English Wikipedia list, but incorrectly presented as a Norse term for a bow of Odin, rather than a Japanese phrase translating Ýdalir's meaning of "Yew Dales". This confusion resulted in the inclusion of "Ichaival" elsewhere as a bow of Odin originating in Norse mythology, notably in the 2014 video game Smite. The erroneous term was briefly removed in 2015 but quickly restored; it was removed more finally from the English Wikipedia article in 2018.

The Icelandic heavy metal band Skálmöld released an album titled Ýdalir in 2023. The album is inspired by Grímnismál and features a title track about the location.
