= Season: A Letter to the Future =

2023 adventure video game

- Developer: Scavengers Studio
- Publisher: Scavengers Studio
- Director: Kevin Sullivan
- Platforms: PlayStation 4; PlayStation 5; Windows
- Release: January 31, 2023
- Genre: Adventure
- Mode: Single-player

Season: A Letter to the Future (Note: Stylized as SEASON: A letter to the future) is a 2023 adventure game developed and published by Scavengers Studio. The player controls a young woman from a small village documenting the world as it comes to an end. The game was released in January 2023 for PlayStation 4, PlayStation 5, and Windows.

Season received generally positive reviews from critics for its writing and art style.

== Gameplay ==
In Season, the player controls Estelle, a woman traveling the world, as she records her experiences in her journal. She can document her sightings by writing, drawing, taking photos, and recording audio and videos. The game also features extended bicycling segments. When Estelle dismounts, she can interact with non-player characters and share her findings with them.

== Plot ==
Season follows the story of Estelle, a young woman who leaves her isolated home for the first time to create a record of the world for the next generation before a mysterious cataclysm wipes everything away.

== Development ==
Scavengers Studio was founded in 2015 in Canada and previously published Darwin Project before moving on to Season. According to Scavengers CEO Amélie Lamarche, "I really wanted the studio to build a game that is unique in its genre, accessible to a wide audience, and leads players into a striking story, elegant and fully felt. Kevin presented this idea to me at the right time and the universe it offered immediately charmed me. Season's creative direction pushes the boundaries of anything I’ve seen so far. It is a quest for adventures of astonishing beauty, but also full of the unexpected."

Development was stalled after multiple current and former Scavengers Studio employees accused studio co-founder Simon Darveau of hostile workplace behavior during the development of both Season and Darwin Project. In response, the studio issued several measures to protect employees from further harassment.

== Marketing and release ==
Season was first revealed at The Game Awards 2020. On June 2, 2022, a new trailer for Season was shown on at a Sony State of Play presentation, showing a release window for Autumn 2022 and now including the subtitle A Letter to the Future. However, the development team later posted on the game's official blog that it had been delayed to early 2023. In October 2022, the development team released a demo for the game playable at Steam Next Fest.

In December 2022, Scavengers Studio revealed a new release date for January 31, 2023.

== Reception ==
Reception

Aggregate score
| Aggregator | Score |
|---|---|
| Metacritic | PC: 80/100; PS5: 76/100 |

Review scores
| Publication | Score |
|---|---|
| Destructoid | 6.5/10 |
| Digital Trends | 4/5 stars |
| Famitsu | 33/40 |
| GamePro | 74/100 |
| GameSpot | 8/10 |
| GamesRadar+ | 3.5/5 stars |
| Jeuxvideo.com | 17/20 |
| PC Gamer (US) | 69/100 |
| Polygon | Recommended |
| Push Square | 8/10 stars |
| Shacknews | 8/10 |
| The Guardian | 3/5 stars |
| Press Start Australia | 9/10 |
| Screen Rant | 4/5 stars |

Season: A Letter to the Future received "generally favorable" reviews from critics, according to review aggregator Metacritic.

In Rock Paper Shotgun's review of the game, Rachel Watts praised the storytelling, writing "The way its story unfolds feels highly engrossing, like watching a photograph slowly develop until you have a complete picture of this curious, beautiful place." Writing for The Verge, Andrew Webster said, "I felt just like the main character: venturing out into the great unknown, constantly surprised and amazed by what I found." Vikki Blake of Eurogamer praised the atmosphere and scrapbooking mechanics, but criticized the bike controls and the inability to create multiple save files.

The game's art direction was also the subject of praise. Watts described the world as "bloody gorgeous", while Vice wrote that the setting was "as dense and beautiful as it is fleeting" and the world design "makes the act of photographing the dying valley a melancholy joy."

The Guardian liked the biking mechanics and the camera, but criticized the world the protagonist explored, saying the world "feels less like a real place and more like an amalgam of cultural influences scrubbed of their real-world significance". GameSpot praised how much of the story and content was optional, giving the player freedom to decide what was meaningful to them, "It also acts like an insightful mirror, reflecting back onto the player not just what they experienced, but how they interpreted it".

=== Sales ===
By June 2023, Season: A Letter to the Future had sold 60,000 units, which was deemed a commercial failure for Scavengers Studio. This resulted in layoffs at the developer sixth months after release, leaving only 16 employees left.

=== Accolades ===
| Year | Award | Category | Result | Ref. |
|---|---|---|---|---|
| 2020 | Ubisoft Indie Series 2020 | Special Prize | Won | |
| 2021 | 2021 NYX Game Awards | PC Game - Best Visual Art | Won | |
| 2021 | Xsolla XDC Contest Canada | Special Prize | Won | |
| 2022 | indiePlay China Game Award | Best Overseas Game | Won | |
| 2023 | Webby Awards 2023 | Independent Creator | Won | |
| 2023 | Webby Awards 2023 | Best Art Direction | Nominated | |

== See also ==
- Wheel World
