= Flywrench =

2015 video game

- Developer: Messhof
- Publisher: Messhof
- Designers: Mark Essen; Kristy Norindr; Neilson Koerner-Safrata
- Programmers: Mark Essen; Kristy Norindr
- Artists: Mark Essen; Kristy Norindr; Clemens Scott
- Writers: Mark Essen; Kurt Koller
- Composer: Daedelus
- Engine: GameMaker Studio
- Platforms: Windows, OS X, PlayStation 4
- Release: Windows, OS X: WW: August 24, 2015; PlayStation 4: WW: February 14, 2017
- Genre: Action
- Mode: Single-player

Flywrench is a 2015 action video game developed and published by Messhof. The game puts the player in the role of 6802, a spacecraft floating through the Solar System in search of a mysterious access point. As 6802 passes the different planets (including Pluto) towards the Sun, the player is tasked to maneuver 6802 through a variety of levels, in which they, by pressing or holding one of two certain buttons, must change 6802's color adaptively to barriers blocking the way to the finish and at the same time control 6802's movement behavior.

== Development ==
Gameplay screenshot.

The game was created by Mark Essen under the pseudonym Messhof. After three previous incarnations since, of which one, also titled Flywrench, was released in 2007, Essen launched a Kickstarter campaign to expand upon his 2007-released game, seeking US$5,000 from September 20, 2009. The campaign concluded on November 1, 2009, with a total of US$5,070 funded by 29 backers. Essen acquired his master's degree at the University of California in 2010, and continued to publish free games under the Messhof banner, partially in collaboration with Adult Swim Games, and, together with Kristy Norindr, incorporated Messhof LLC in 2013, leading up to the release of Nidhogg (2014), but did not communicate about the development or fate of Flywrench, up until releasing a new teaser to accompany his Independent Games Festival entry on October 22, 2014, and then until a full trailer on July 29, 2015.

== Release ==
Flywrench was released for Microsoft Windows and OS X through Steam on August 24, 2015, and a port for PlayStation 4 was released through PlayStation Network on February 14, 2017. The game received "generally favorable" reviews. Flywrench's soundtrack, comprising original tracks by Mark Redito, Baths, Kuh Lida, Danny Scrilla, Om Unit, Knife City, Dntel, Reso, Syndakit, Daedelus, Sweatson Klank, and Goodnight Cody, was released by Magical Properties on November 13, 2015. 6802, under the name "Flywrench", also became a playable character in Super Meat Boy (2010).
