= Niðafjöll =

Location in Norse mythology

In Norse mythology, Niðafjöll (Old Norse: Niðafjǫll, [ˈnɪðafjɔlː]; lit. 'niða-fell') is a location in the northern underworld. Niðafjöll is the site from which the dragon Nidhogg comes. According to Snorri Sturluson, the good and virtuous people will live here in a golden palace after Ragnarök, despite its proximity to Hel.

Niðafjöll is mentioned in Völuspá (verse 66) from the Poetic Edda:

Þar kømr inn dimmi dreki fljúgandi, naðr fránn, neðan frá Niðafjǫllum. Berr sér í fjǫðrum —flýgr vǫll yfir— Níðhǫggr nái—

Translation:

There comes the dim dragon flying, a gleaming adder, below from the Nida-fell. Carrying in between the feathers —flying the land over— Nidhogg corpses does—.

== Etymology ==
Fell (Old Norse: fjǫll) is an old word for mountain and highland, but the prefix niða- is unclear. A direct cognate is unknown, but it is speculated to be related to Swedish: nedan, the "waning" face of the moon, as opposed to ny ("new"), the "emerging" face of the moon. Thus a potential direct translation could be "waning mountains", or rather, "mountains of waning". Other suggestions have been something like "dark mountains".

== Other sources ==
- Faulkes, Anthony (trans. and ed.) (1987) Edda of Snorri Sturluson (Everyman's Library) ISBN 0-460-87616-3
- Lindow, John (2001) Handbook of Norse mythology (Santa Barbara: ABC-Clio) ISBN 1-57607-217-7
- Orchard, Andy (1997) Dictionary of Norse Myth and Legend (Cassell) ISBN 0-304-34520-2
- Simek, Rudolf (2007) translated by Angela Hall. Dictionary of Northern Mythology (D.S. Brewer) ISBN 0-85991-513-1
