= Með vættum =

Með Vættum

Studio album by Skálmöld
- Released: 11 November 2014
- Genre: Viking metal, folk metal
- Language: Icelandic
- Label: Napalm Records

Skálmöld chronology
Skálmöld og Sinfóníuhljómsveit Íslands (live) (2013)	Með Vættum (2014)	Vögguvísur Yggdrasils (2016)

Með vættum ("Among Vættir" in Icelandic) is the third full-length album by the Icelandic viking/folk metal band Skálmöld, released on 11 November 2014 via Napalm Records.

== Music ==
Með vættum tells of a woman, Þórunn, born on the north coast of Iceland. During her life, she travels around the island from north, to east, to south, to west. As she does so, she grows older and dies. On each coast she must fight a battle against enemies coming in from sea. She acts as a guardian to the island. In each battle she is aided by a wight, of which there are four traditional versions in Icelandic mythology: eagle from the north, dragon from the east, giant from the south, and a bull from the west, as well as wraiths on the sea all around the isle.

The protagonist was named after the daughter of the band's keyboard player, Gunnar Ben. Songwriter Snæbjörn likes to use names for the characters which are familiar to him and to which he has some connection.

== Track listing ==
All tracks are written by Skálmöld

No.	Title	Translation	Length
1.	"Að vori"	In Spring	3:08
2.	"Með fuglum"	Among Birds	6:29
3.	"Að sumri"	In Summer	5:11
4.	"Með drekum"	Among Dragons	7:29
5.	"Að hausti"	In Fall	3:53
6.	"Með jötnum"	Among Jötnar	9:43
7.	"Að vetri"	In Winter	5:25
8.	"Með griðungum"	Among Bulls	9:05
Total length:			50:23

Digipak edition bonus track
No.	Title	Translation	Length
9.	"Sleipnir" (live)	The Slipper	6:26
10.	"Valhöll" (live)	Hall of the Slain	5:28
Total length:			62:17

== Personnel ==
- Björgvin Sigurðsson – vocals, guitar
- Baldur Ragnarsson – guitar, backing vocals
- Snæbjörn Ragnarsson – bass
- Þráinn Árni Baldvinsson – guitar
- Gunnar Ben – keyboards, oboe
- Jón Geir Jóhannsson – drums
