= Sorgir =

Studio album by Skálmöld
- Released: 12 October 2018
- Studio: Hljóðverk, Reykjavík
- Genre: Viking metal, folk metal
- Length: 47:40
- Language: Icelandic
- Label: Napalm Records
- Producer: Einar Vilberg

Skálmöld chronology
Vögguvísur Yggdrasils (2016)	Sorgir (2018)	10 Year Anniversary: Live in Reykjavík (2020)

Sorgir ("Sorrows" or "Griefs" in Icelandic) is the fifth full-length album by the Icelandic viking/folk metal band Skálmöld, released on 12 October 2018 via Napalm Records.

== Concept and recording ==
The album is divided into two parts. The first four tracks are labeled Sagnir (Tales) and each tell a tragic story. Track number five to eight are labeled Svipir (Ghosts) and tell the same stories, but from the perspective of the ghosts who caused the disastrous events. The names of the Svipir tracks are taken from the names of mythological beings.

Sorgir was made two years after Skálmöld's previous album Vögguvísur Yggdrasils. The band described the creation process as quick and raw. The album was produced by Einar Vilberg and recorded at the studio Hljóðverk in Reykjavík.

== Reception ==
Arnar Eggert Thoroddsen of RÚV wrote that the album stays within its genre conventions but is the band's most varied to date. He highlighted the song "Skotta", which reminded him of "Metallica's best song, 'Disposable Heroes'". Metal.de complimented the fast solos and rhythm structures, and wrote that the best part was the "melodic offensive" of the last two tracks, "Móri" and "Mara". Metal Hammer's Dom Lawson wrote: "Whether in full-on longboat assault mode on the marauding, mid-paced Ljósið or exploring more expansive dynamics on closing tour-de-force Mara, the power of the message and the sincerity of the messengers carries every stirring ensemble splurge forward to Valhalla with maximum uplift."

== Track listing ==
All lyrics are written by Snæbjörn Ragnarsson; all music is composed by Skálmöld.

Sagnir
No.	Title	Translation	Length
1.	"Ljósið"	The Light	05:13
2.	"Sverðið"	The Sword	06:34
3.	"Brúnin"	The Edge	04:43
4.	"Barnið"	The Child	04:45

Svipir
No.	Title	Translation	Length
5.	"Skotta"	Female draugr	06:54
6.	"Gangári"	Wandering draugr	04:32
7.	"Móri"	Male draugr	06:39
8.	"Mara"	Mare	08:20
Total length:			47:40

Digipak edition bonus track
No.	Title	Translation	Length
9.	"Höndin sem veggina klórar"	The Hand That Scratches the Walls	06:39
Total length:			54:19

== Personnel ==
Skálmöld

- Snæbjörn Ragnarsson – bass, vocals
- Jón Geir Jóhannsson – drums, vocals
- Baldur Ragnarsson – guitar, vocals
- Þráinn Árni Baldvinsson – guitar, vocals
- Gunnar Ben – keyboards, oboe
- Björgvin Sigurðsson – vocals, guitar

Guests

- Óttarr Proppé – vocals on track 5
- Ragnheiður Steindórsdóttir – vocals on track 7
