= Nidhogg =

Serpent from Norse mythology

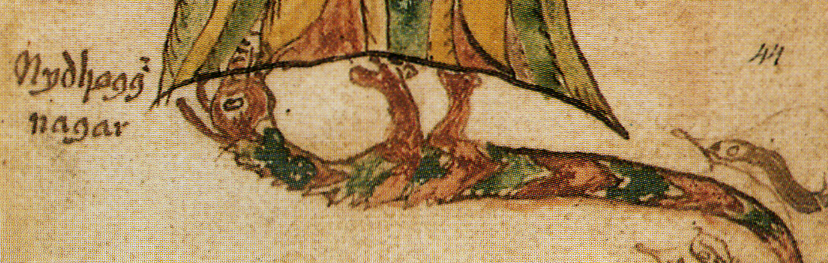
Níðhǫggr gnaws the roots of Yggdrasill in this illustration from a 17th-century Icelandic manuscript.

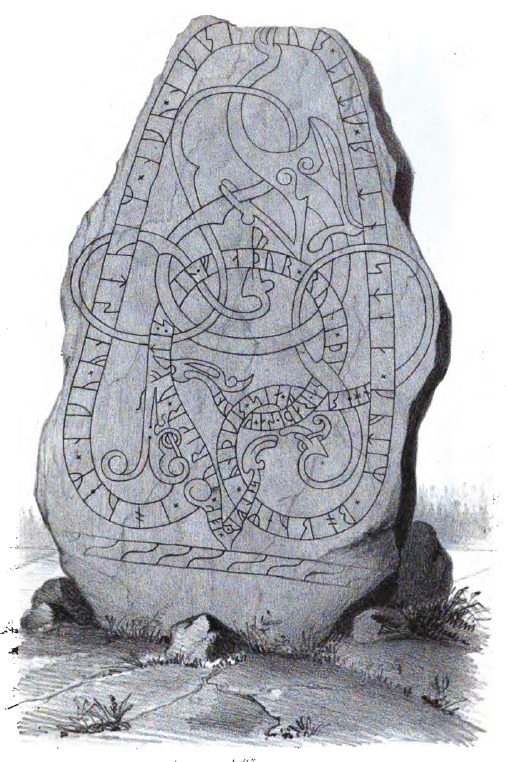
Runestone U 887 (1070–1100), Skillsta, Sweden, showing a runic dragon and a bipedal winged dragon. Winged dragons are rare in Germanic art and myth prior to the 13th century, and Nidhogg is uniquely described as feathered and flying in Völuspá.

Nidhogg (Old Norse: Níðhǫggr, [ˈniːðˌhɔɡːz̠]; older Icelandic: Níðhöggr, Modern Icelandic: Níðhöggur) is a Germanic dragon in Norse mythology who is said to gnaw at the roots of the world tree, Yggdrasil, and is likewise associated with the dead in Hel and Niflheim.

== Etymology ==
While the suffix of the name, -hǫggr, literally "hewer", clearly means "biter, striker", etc, (Note: The word 'hew' (hogg/hugg) is a synonym for "bite" in Nordic language; compare the name for killer whale: spækhugger^{da}, spekkhoggar^{no}, späckhuggare^{sv}, lit. 'blubber hewer'.) the prefix is not as clear. In particular, the length of the first vowel is not determined in the original sources. It could be niðr ("down, downwards"), thus "Biter Below (the roots)", or níð (see below).

In historical Norse society, níð (archaic English: nith) was a term for a social stigma, implying the loss of honor and the status of a villain. Thus, its name might refer to its role as a horrific monster in its action of chewing the corpses of the inhabitants of Niflheim: those guilty of murder, adultery, and oath-breaking, thus something akin to "Malice Biter".

The prefix might be the same as used in Niðafjǫll ("niða-mountains"), from which Nidhogg appears after ragnarök. The prefix niða- has no known cognates, but it is speculated to be related to Swedish: nedan (Old Swedish: niþ, nidhan), the "waning" face of the moon, as opposed to ny ("new"), the "emerging" face of the moon, thus a potential translation could be "mountains of waning", or something like "dark mountains". Thus, some scholars prefer the reading "Striker in the Dark". Compare Old Norse: niðamyrkr, niðmyrkr, Swedish: nidamörker ("pitch-darkness"), Swedish: nidmörk ("pitch-dark").

In either case, the name seems to refer to him gnawing on the roots of the tree Yggdrasil and the bodies of the evil dead.

=== Orthography ===
In the standardized Old Norse orthography, the name is spelled Níðhǫggr, but the letter ǫ is frequently replaced with the Modern Icelandic ö for reasons of familiarity or technical expediency.

The name can be represented in English texts with i for í; th, d or (rarely) dh for ð; o for ǫ and optionally without r as in Modern Scandinavian reflexes. The Modern Icelandic form Níðhöggur is also sometimes seen, with special characters or similarly anglicized. The Danish forms Nidhug and Nidhøg can also be encountered; or Norwegian Nidhogg, or Swedish Nidhögg or Nidhugg. The English cognate construction would be Nithhewer.

== Prose Edda ==
According to the Gylfaginning part of Snorri Sturluson's Prose Edda, Níðhǫggr is a being which gnaws one of the three roots of Yggdrasill. It is sometimes believed that the roots are trapping the beast from the world. This root is placed over Niflheimr and Níðhǫggr gnaws it from beneath. The same source also says that "[t]he squirrel called Ratatoskr runs up and down the length of the Ash, bearing envious words between the eagle and Nídhǫggr [the snake]."

In the Skáldskaparmál section of the Prose Edda Snorri specifies Níðhǫggr as a serpent in a list of names of such creatures:

These are names for serpents: dragon, Fafnir, Jormungand, adder, Nidhogg, snake, viper, Goinn, Moinn, Grafvitnir, Grabak, Ofnir, Svafnir, masked one.

Snorri's knowledge of Níðhǫggr seems to come from two of the Eddic poems: Grímnismál and Völuspá.

Later in Skáldskaparmál, Snorri includes Níðhǫggr in a list of various terms and names for swords.

== Poetic Edda ==
The poem Grímnismál identifies a number of beings which live in Yggdrasill. The tree suffers great hardship from all the creatures which live on it. The poem identifies Níðhǫggr as tearing at the tree from beneath and also mentions Ratatoskr as carrying messages between Níðhǫggr and the eagle who lives at the top of the tree. Snorri Sturluson often quotes Grímnismál and clearly used it as his source for this information.

The poem Völuspá mentions Níðhöggr/Níðhǫggr twice. The first instance is in its description of Náströnd.

E. Björnsson's edition:

Sal sá hon standa
sólu fjarri
Náströndu á,
norðr horfa dyrr.
Fellu eitrdropar
inn um ljóra,
sá er undinn salr
orma hryggjum.

Sá hon þar vaða
þunga strauma
menn meinsvara
ok morðvarga
ok þanns annars glepr
eyrarúnu.
Þar saug Niðhöggr
nái framgengna,
sleit vargr vera—
vituð ér enn, eða hvat ?

Dronke's translation:

A hall she saw standing
remote from the sun
on Dead Body Shore.
Its door looks north.
There fell drops of venom
in through the roof vent.
That hall is woven
of serpents' spines.

She saw there wading
onerous streams
men perjured
and wolfish murderers
and the one who seduces
another's close-trusted wife.
There Malice Striker sucked
corpses of the dead,
the wolf tore men.
Do you still seek to know? And what?

Free translation:

Hall she saw standing
far from the sun
on Náströnd;
the door looking north.
Atterdrops fell
in around the roof vent,
such is the hall woven
of worms' spines.

She saw there wading
heavy streams
perjurious men
and murderers
and the one seducing another's
ear entrusted (life partner)
There sucked Nidhogg
bodies of the departed,
the monster tore the men—
do you know yet, or what?

Nidhogg is also mentioned at the end of Völuspá, where he is identified as a dragon and a serpent (see Germanic dragon).

E. Björnsson's edition:

Þar kømr inn dimmi
dreki fljúgandi,
naðr fránn, neðan
frá Niðafjöllum.
Berr sér í fjöðrum
—flýgr völl yfir—
Níðhöggr nái—
nú mun hon søkkvask.

Dronke's translation:

There comes the shadowy
dragon flying,
glittering serpent, up
from Dark of the Moon Hills.
He carries in his pinions
—he flies over the field—
Malice Striker, corpses.
Now will she sink.

Free translation:

There comes the dim
dragon flying,
a gleaming adder, below
from the Niðafjöll.
Carrying in between the feathers
—flying the land over—
Nidhogg corpses does—
now may she sink.

The context and meaning of this stanza are disputed. The most prevalent opinion is that the arrival of Níðhǫggr heralds Ragnarök and thus that the poem ends on a tone of ominous warning. It could be, however, as the prevalent themes of Norse mythology are those of change and renewal, that this could be a 'redemption' of the serpent, 'shedding' the corpses and beginning life anew, much like a macabre Phoenix, or perhaps, lifting the bodies of the righteous rulers mentioned two stanzas before (the stanza immediately before is considered spurious by translator Henry Adam Bellows), so that they can dwell in Gimle, and then either Níðhǫggr sinks, or the völva sinks, depending on the translation, and the poem ends.

Níðhǫggr is not mentioned elsewhere in any ancient source.

== Comparisons to Celtic culture ==
At least one Irish story, that of Conneda, tells of a man journeying into the otherworld and having to work his way past several giant snakes with names of different sins and transgressions. This would imply snakes consume, torment or punish the bad souls in Celtic culture. Similarly, Nidhogg is seen as the parent of all the snakes of the Norse underworld realm of Náströnd, separated from the rest of Hel by the river Gjallar, which is made up of their acidic poison. This is where souls that are denied crossing on the Gjallarbrú wind up and where Loki is eventually imprisoned. This is probably a reasonable explanation for his name.

== In popular culture ==
- In the Japanese light novel series High School DxD (2008–2018), Nidhogg appears as the "Abyss Rage Dragon" (hiragana) or "Extrajudicial Death Dragon" (kanji), a legendary "Evil Dragon" of Northern Europe. An "Eastern Dragon", he's described as having a 20 meter long black serpentine body with a khaki belly (cf. the Swedish lindworm), but with four limbs and four wings, and a huge attery mouth. Its given lore follows the Norse myth more or less: It's problematic, as it always revives due to its deep vindictiveness, and said to be able to survive Ragnarök (the end of the world). It's full of greed and hunger, swallowing everything it lays its eyes upon. Its also said to live in Niflheim.
- In the video game World of Warcraft: Legion (2016) a storm dragon world boss in the Norse-themed Stormheim zone is named Nithogg.
- In the video game Fire Emblem Heroes (2017) a hero is named Níðhöggr.
- In the Japanese manga series One Piece (1997–), there exists a Mythical Zoan Devil Fruit that allow one to transform into a gigantic flying bipedal black dragon called Nidhogg (introduced 2026). This form is so powerful that is it known as the God of War. It is eaten by Loki the Prince of Elbaph.
- In the video games Nidhogg (video game) and Nidhogg 2 the two players are fighting for the right to be consumed by Nidhogg.
