= Gleipnir =

Unbreakable binding in Norse mythology

In Norse mythology, Gleipnir (Old Norse "open one") is the binding that holds the mighty wolf Fenrir (as attested in chapter 34 of the Prose Edda book Gylfaginning). Its name means "the entangled one" or "the deceiver", and has also been translated as "wolf lock" and "absurd lock".

== The making of Gleipnir ==
In Norse mythology, Gleipnir is the third rope created by the Norse gods to bind the demon wolf Fenrir. The Gods had attempted to bind Fenrir twice before with huge chains of metal, the iron chains of Leyding and Dromi, both of which Fenrir had torn apart. Therefore, they commissioned the dwarves to forge a chain that was impossible to break. After the gods failed to bind the demon wolf twice in a row, they asked Freyr's messenger Skírnir to find the strongest ropes made by the dwarves. The materials of the bonds are:

- The sound of a cat's steps
- The beard of women
- The roots of mountains
- The sinews of the bear
- The breath of the fish
- The spittle of the birds

The dwarves made the chain magically from six things in the world (and these things are now missing in the world because they were taken away to be part of the chain) Even though Gleipnir is as thin as a silken ribbon, it is deceptive and actually stronger than any iron chain. It was forged by the dwarves in their underground realm of Niðavellir.

Gleipnir, having bound Fenrir securely, was the cause of Týr's lost hand, for Fenrir bit it off in revenge when he was not freed. Gleipnir is said to hold until Ragnarök, when Fenrir will finally break free and devour Odin.

== General and cited references ==
- Orchard, Andy (1997). Dictionary of Norse Myth and Legend. Cassell. ISBN 0-304-34520-2
