= Baldur (album) =

Studio album by Skálmöld
- Released: December 15, 2010
- Recorded: May – June 2010 at Studio Reflex, Reykjavík
- Genres: Viking metal, folk metal
- Length: 50:54 / 66:36
- Language: Icelandic
- Labels: Tutl; Napalm Records
- Producer: Flex Árnason

Skálmöld chronology
Baldur (2010)	Börn Loka (2012)

Baldur is the début full-length album by the Icelandic Viking / folk metal band Skálmöld. It was first released in Iceland and the Faeroe Islands on December 15, 2010 through Tutl and re-released by Napalm Records worldwide in July – August 2011.

== Background ==
While Skálmöld was initially formed with intention to be just a hobby, the band members soon decided to record an album. In January 2010, the band recorded its first demo, consisting of two song, "Árás" and "Kvaðning", but it was never released. In May 2010, Skálmöld entered Studio Reflex in Reykjavík to record its first album.

== Music ==
Baldur is a concept album, telling a story of a fictional eponymous Viking with lyrics inspired by the Icelandic sagas and Norse mythology, entirely in Icelandic. A demon-like creature attacks Baldur's home and kills his wife and children, forcing him on a quest for revenge, aided by two friends. After much hardship, they fight their enemy. Baldur's friends die in the final battle and, having defeated the enemy, he succumbs to his wounds as well, joining his family in Valhalla. For the album's re-release, the band decided to record a bonus track, "Baldur", which proved to be challenging, since it had to supplement the completed story line.

Baldur's lyrics conform to the rules of dróttkvætt, the Old Norse alliterative verse, while music combines folk melodies, with the elements from melodic death, doom and thrash metal, creating an overall epic atmosphere.

The album and protagonist were named after Baldur Ragnarsson, guitarist with the band and brother of main songwriter Snæbjörn. Snæbjörn likes to use names for the characters which are familiar to him and to which he has some connection.

== Track listing ==
All lyrics are written by Snæbjörn Ragnarsson; all music is composed by Skálmöld.

No.	Title	Translation	Length
1.	"Heima"	Home	2:37
2.	"Árás"	Attack	6:06
3.	"Sorg"	Grief	5:25
4.	"Upprisa"	Rebirth	6:34
5.	"För"	Journey	3:57
6.	"Draumur"	Dream	1:30
7.	"Kvaðning"	The Call	7:57
8.	"Hefnd"	Vengeance	5:06
9.	"Dauði"	Death	6:29
10.	"Valhöll"	Valhalla	5:08
11.	"Baldur" (re-release bonus track)		10:29
12.	"Kvaðning (Edit)" (re-release bonus track)		4:50
Total length:			66:36

== Credits ==
- Björgvin Sigurðsson – vocals, guitar
- Baldur Ragnarsson – guitar
- Snæbjörn Ragnarsson – bass
- Þráinn Árni Baldvinsson – guitar
- Gunnar Ben – keyboards, oboe
- Jón Geir Jóhannsson – drums
- Aðalbjörn Tryggvason (Sólstafir) – guest vocals on "Hefnd" and "Árás"
