= Skálmöld =

Icelandic folk metal band

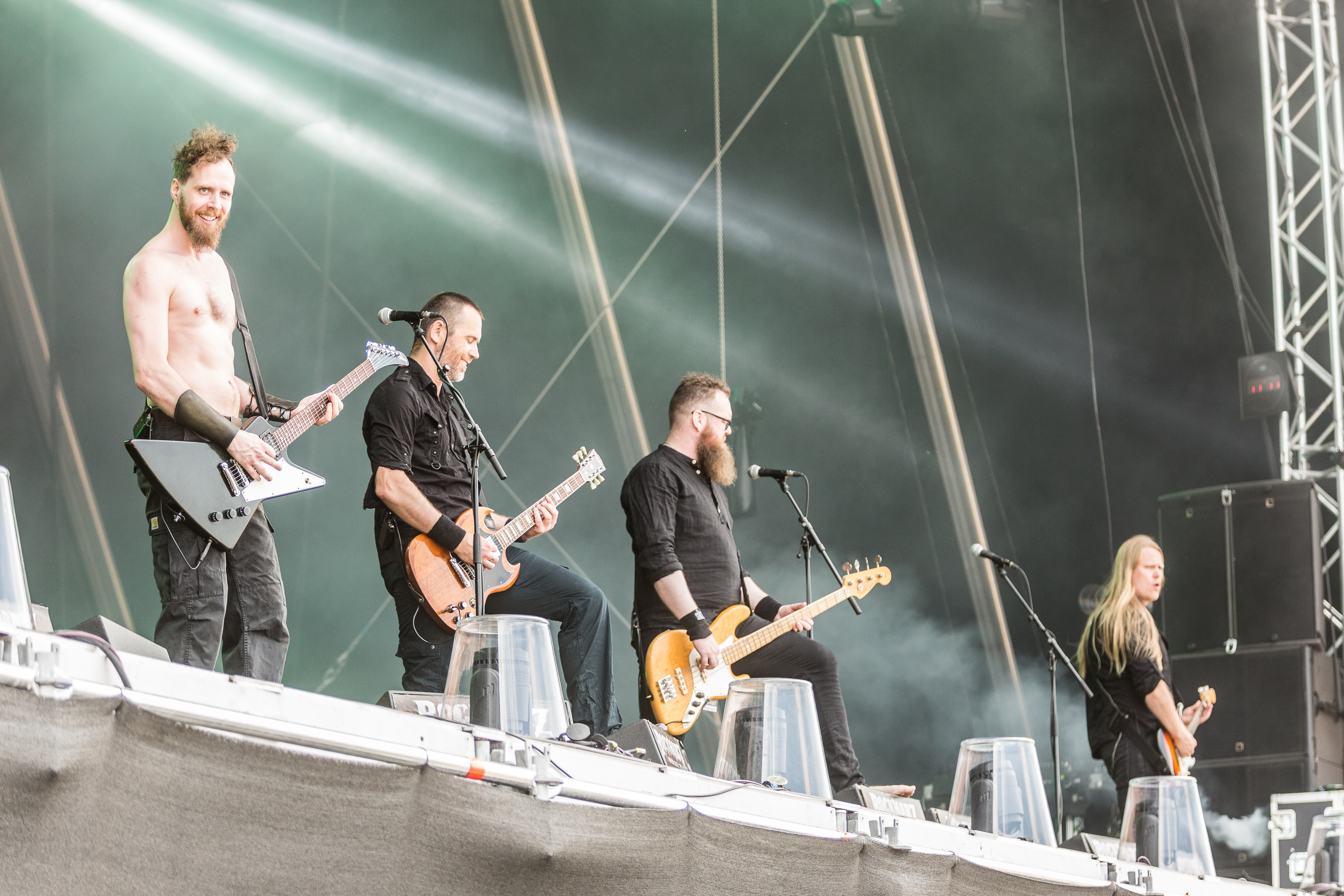
- Skálmöld at Rockharz Open Air 2018

Background information
- Origin: Reykjavík, Iceland
- Genres: Viking metal; folk metal
- Years active: 2009–present
- Labels: Tutl; Napalm Records
- Members: Baldur Ragnarsson; Björgvin Sigurðsson; Gunnar Ben; Jón Geir Jóhannsson; Snæbjörn Ragnarsson; Þráinn Árni Baldvinsson
- Website: skalmold.is

Skálmöld (Icelandic pronunciation: [ˈskaulmœlt]) is a Viking / folk metal band from Reykjavík, Iceland, formed in August 2009. The band's name is literally translated as Age of Swords and also means "lawlessness", referring to the Age of the Sturlungs of Icelandic history, when a civil war broke out between the country's family clans.

== History ==
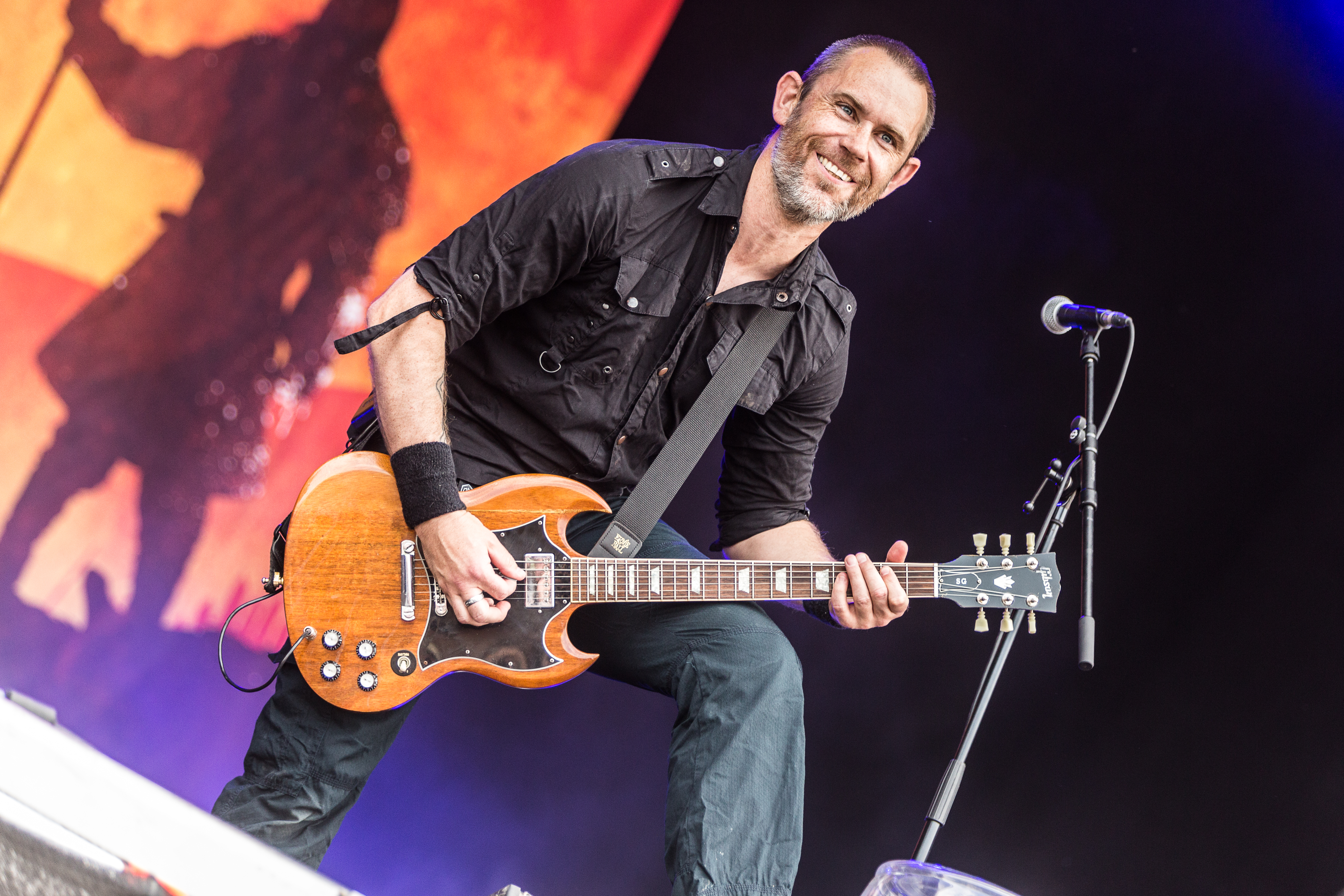
Björgvin Sigurðsson at Rockharz 2018

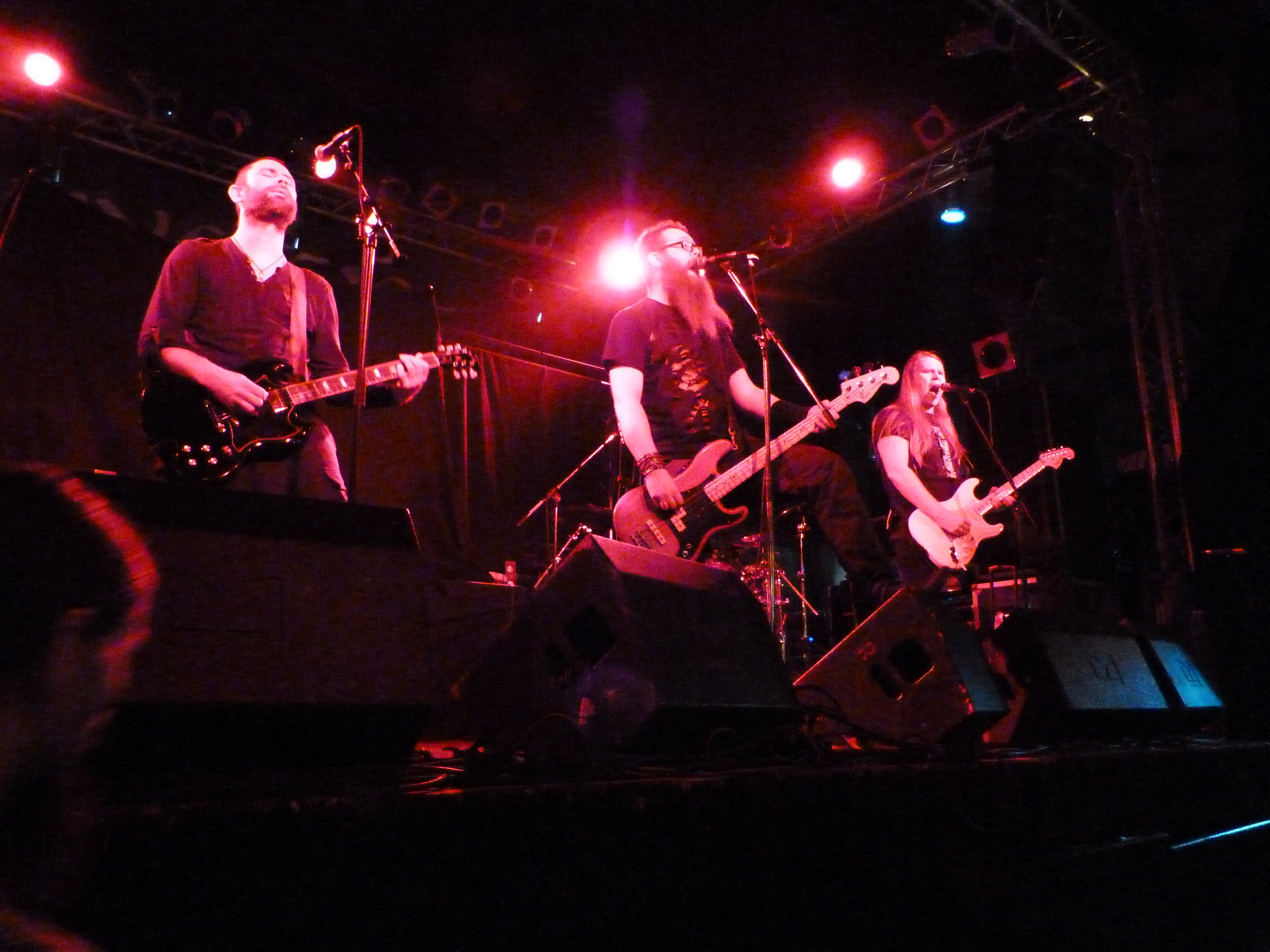
Skálmöld in Club 202

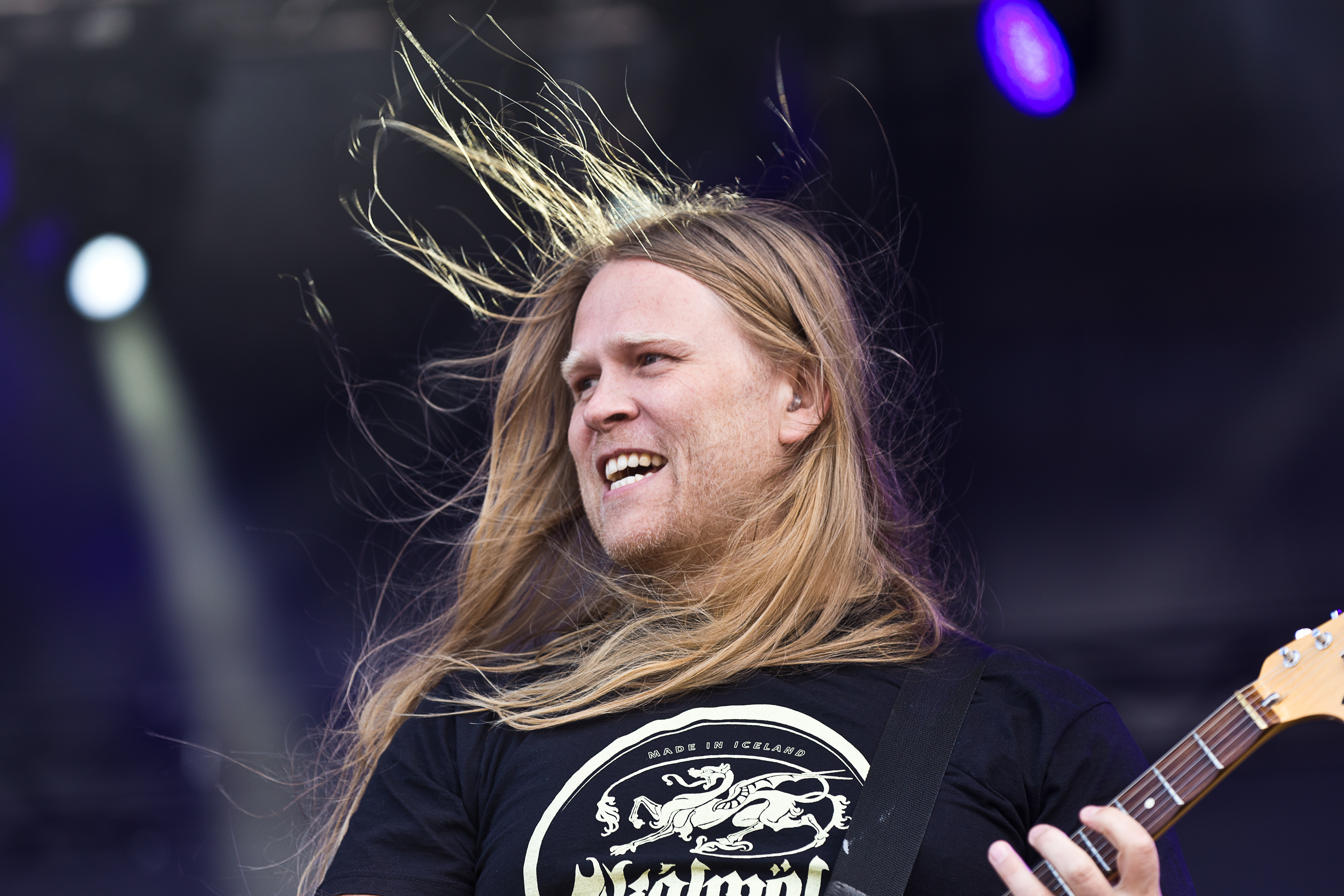
Þráinn Árni Baldvinsson, Rockharz 2015

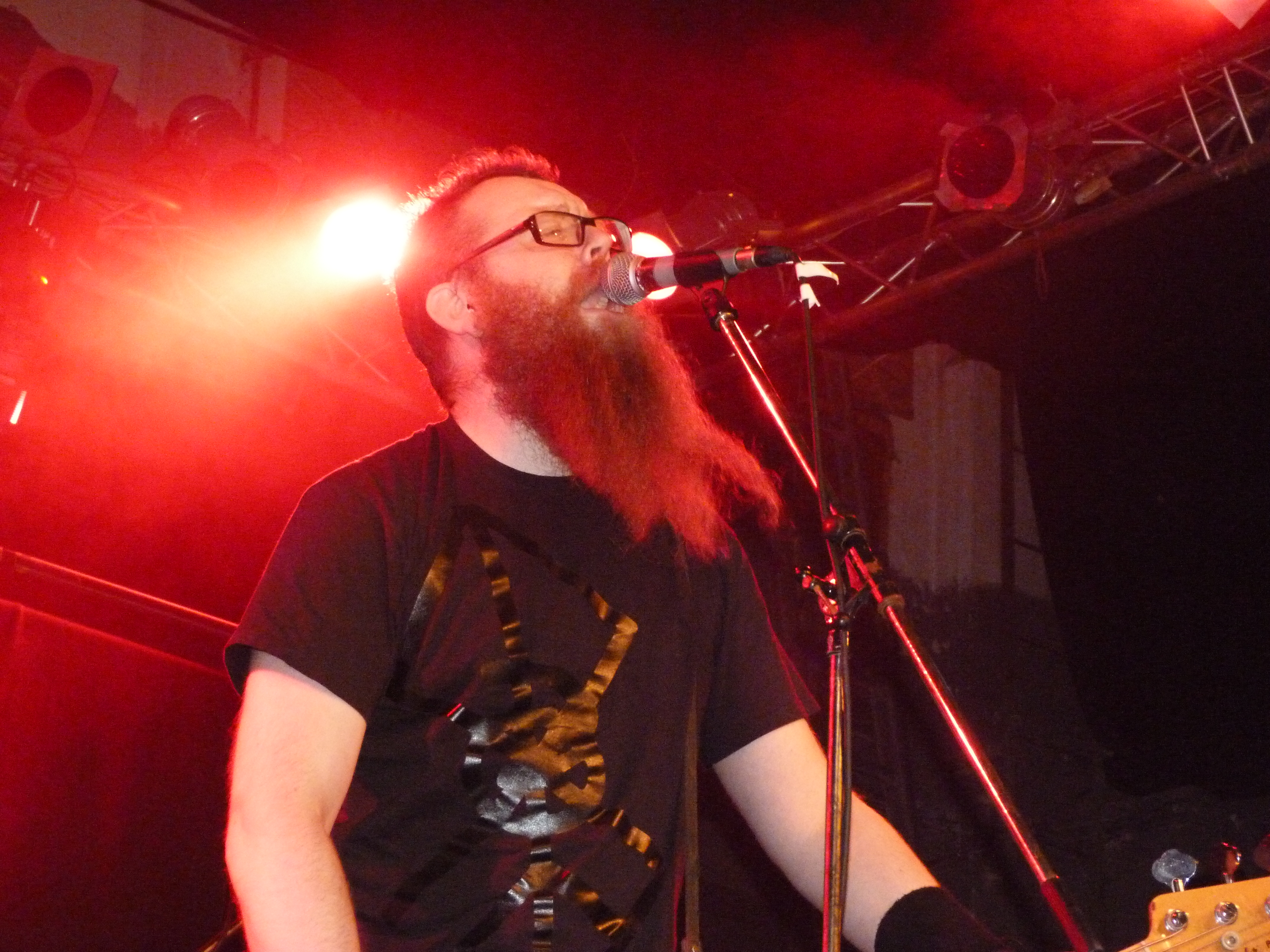
Snæbjörn Ragnarsson

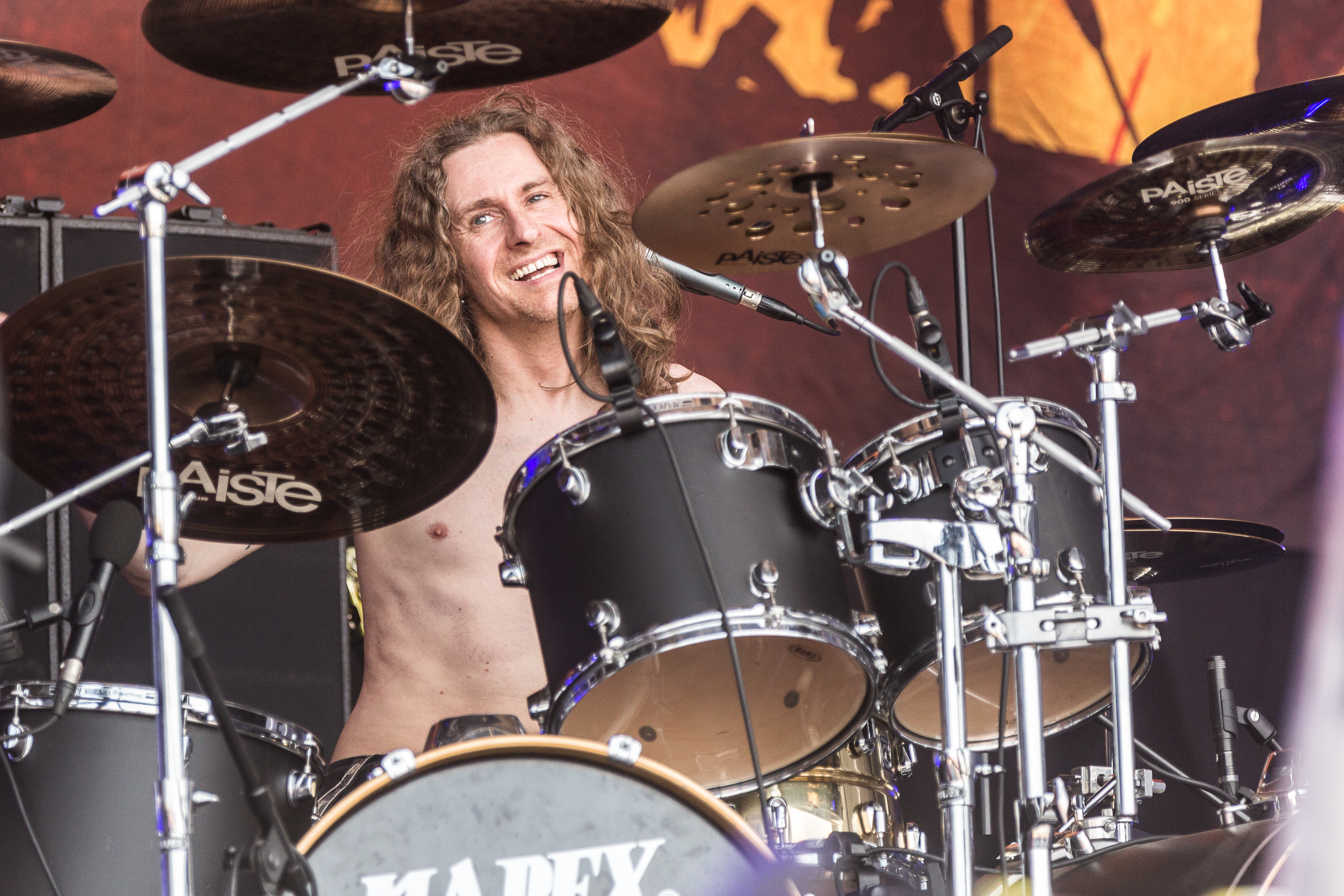
Jón Geir Jóhannsson at Rockharz 2018

Snæbjörn Ragnarsson and Björgvin Sigurðsson, who have been friends since childhood and have played together in various collectives, including death metal and punk bands, decided to start a new metal band, Skálmöld, formed in August 2009 in Reykjavík. The other band members had also been active in the Icelandic music scene. Initially, the band was intended to be merely a hobby, but the members soon decided to record an album before they were "too old and tired". After contacting most of the Icelandic labels—to no avail—the band was signed by the Faroese label Tutl in November 2010, which released the band's debut album Baldur in Iceland and the Faroe Islands. In April 2011, the band signed a record deal with Napalm Records; Baldur was re-released worldwide the following August.

The deal with Napalm gave Skálmöld a significant popularity boost. The band was invited to participate in the Wacken Open Air festival and the Heidenfest 2011 tour.

On April 13, 2012, Skálmöld began recording its second album, Börn Loka, which was released in October the same year.

In November, 2013, Skálmöld played a series of concerts with the Iceland Symphony Orchestra at the Harpa concert hall in Reykjavík. A live album and accompanying video, Skálmöld & Sinfóníuhljómsveit Íslands, was released on 18 December 2013.

The next studio album was Með vættum, released in 2014, which tells the story of a woman who encounters enemies in the north, east, south and west of Iceland, and is assisted by mythological beings. In 2016 Skálmöld released Vögguvísur Yggdrasils, an album themed around the different worlds of Norse cosmology. It was followed by Sorgir in 2018, which tells four tragic stories, each from two different perspectives.

After celebrating its ten-year anniversary with three shows in Reykjavík that became the basis for a live album in 2020, Skálmöld decided to take a pause. The band's official book, The Saga of Skálmöld, was published in 2021. It was written by British author Joel McIver and featured a foreword by President of Iceland Guðni Th. Jóhannesson. Returning from the pause after three years, Skálmöld's sixth studio album Ýdalir released on 18 August 2023 through Napalm Records.

== Musical style ==
From the beginning, Skálmöld's intention has been to combine the sounds of traditional Icelandic music and metal. Initially, the band planned to make considerable use of folk instruments, but soon decided to scale back and operate with three guitar players instead. The band's influences include such metal bands as Metallica, Iron Maiden, Anthrax, Slayer, Amon Amarth and Ensiferum, but also the classical Icelandic composer Jón Leifs. Skálmöld's lyrics, written by Snæbjörn entirely in Icelandic, are inspired by Norse mythology and the Icelandic sagas. The lyrics are furthermore written using Old Norse poetic forms, including fornyrðislag and sléttubönd.

All the band members belong to the heathen religious organisation Ásatrúarfélagið. Jón Geir Jóhannsson explained their belief in the Norse gods as follows: "But you shouldn't personify them. They are not people, they are stories that represent human nature. So yes, the morals are there, but we don't believe in them as 'people'."

== Discography ==
=== Studio albums ===
- 2010: Baldur
- 2012: Börn Loka
- 2014: Með vættum
- 2016: Vögguvísur Yggdrasils
- 2018: Sorgir
- 2023: Ýdalir

=== Live albums ===
- 2013: Skálmöld & Sinfóníuhljómsveit Íslands
- 2020: 10 Year Anniversary: Live in Reykjavík

=== Singles ===
- 2013: "Innrás"

== Members ==
- Björgvin Sigurðsson – vocals, guitar
- Baldur Ragnarsson – guitar, vocals
- Snæbjörn Ragnarsson – bass, vocals
- Þráinn Árni Baldvinsson – guitar, vocals
- Gunnar Ben – oboe, keyboard, vocals
- Jón Geir Jóhannsson – drums, vocals

== Gallery ==
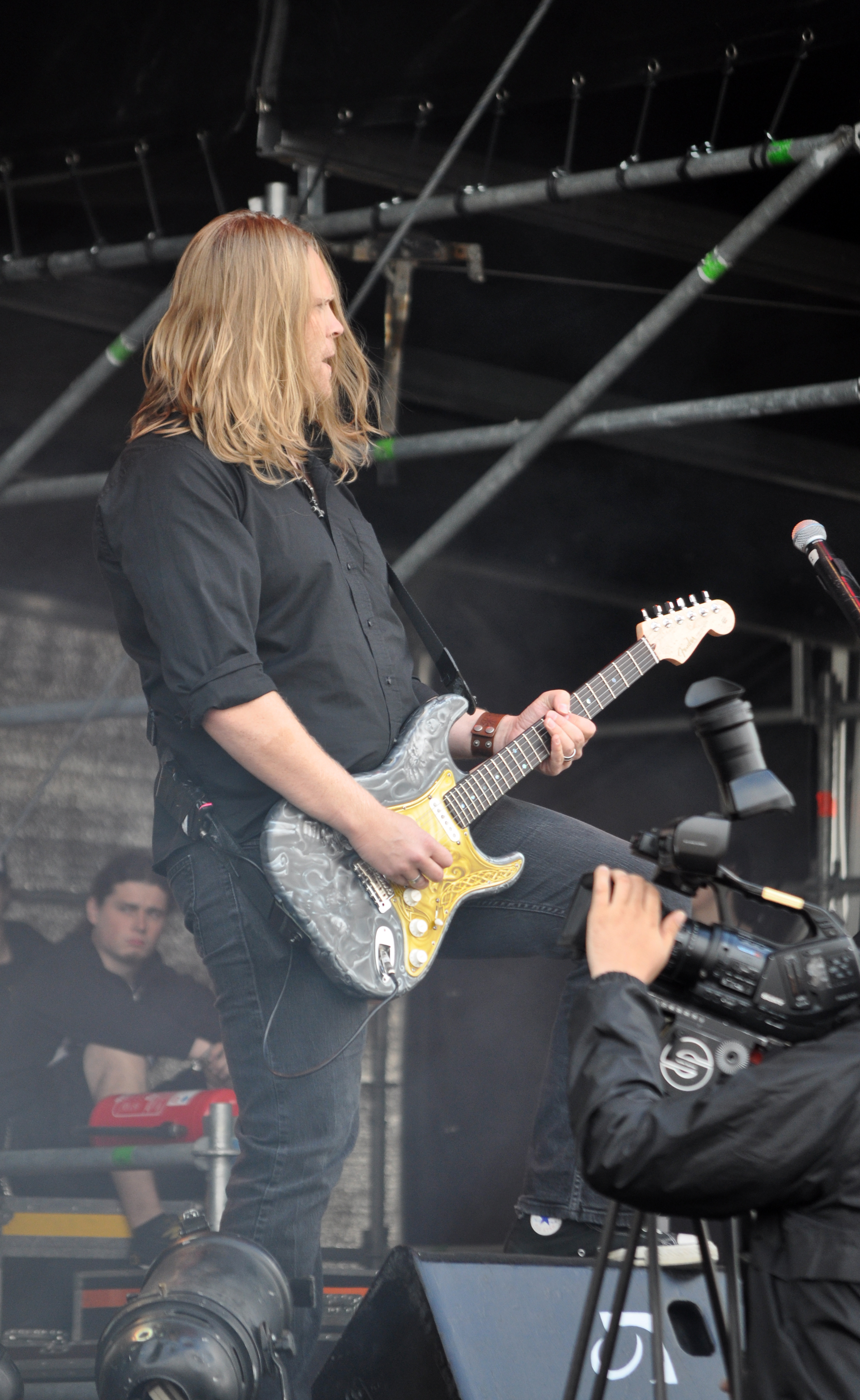
Þráinn Árni Baldvinsson

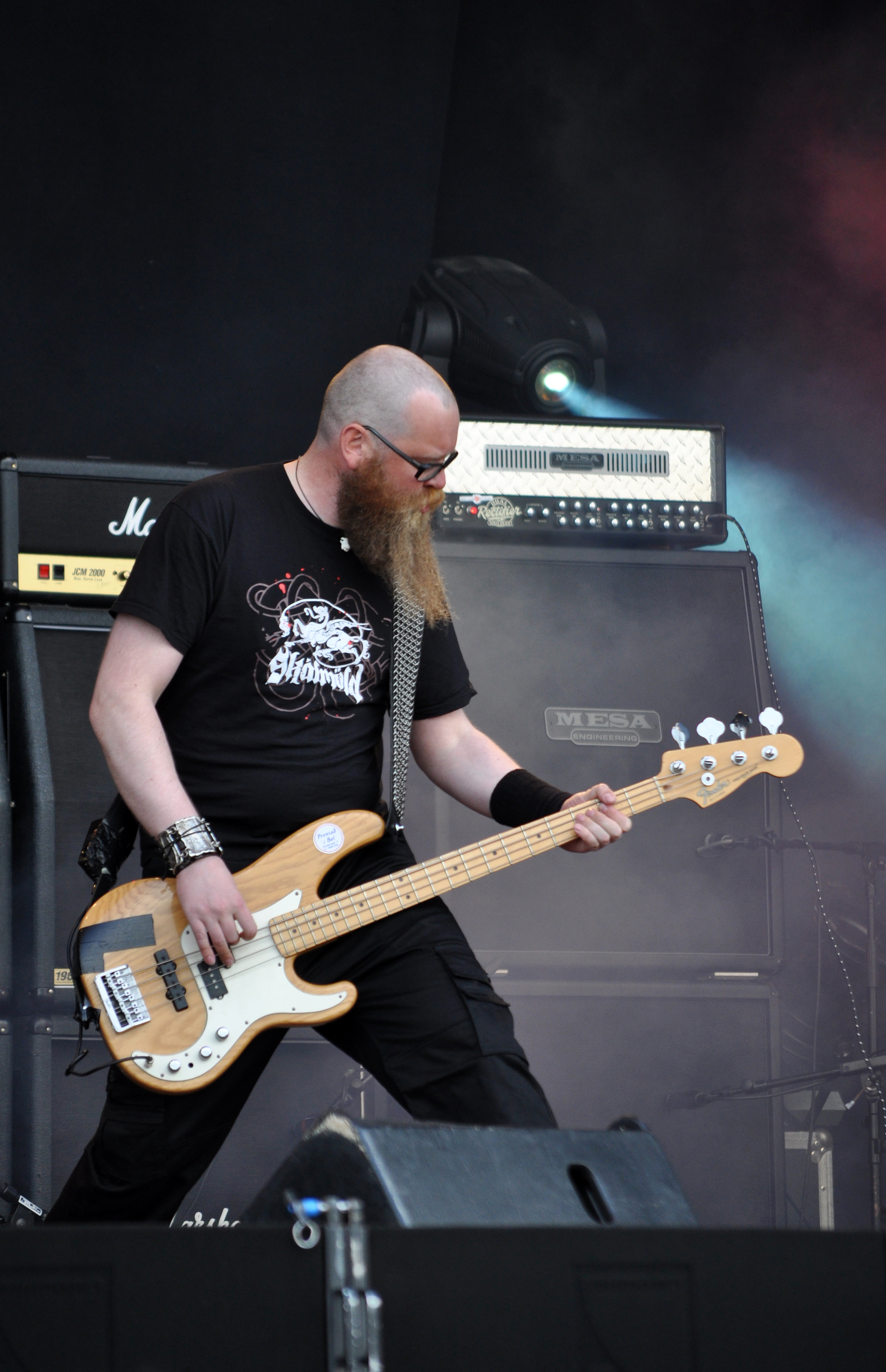
Snæbjörn Ragnarsson

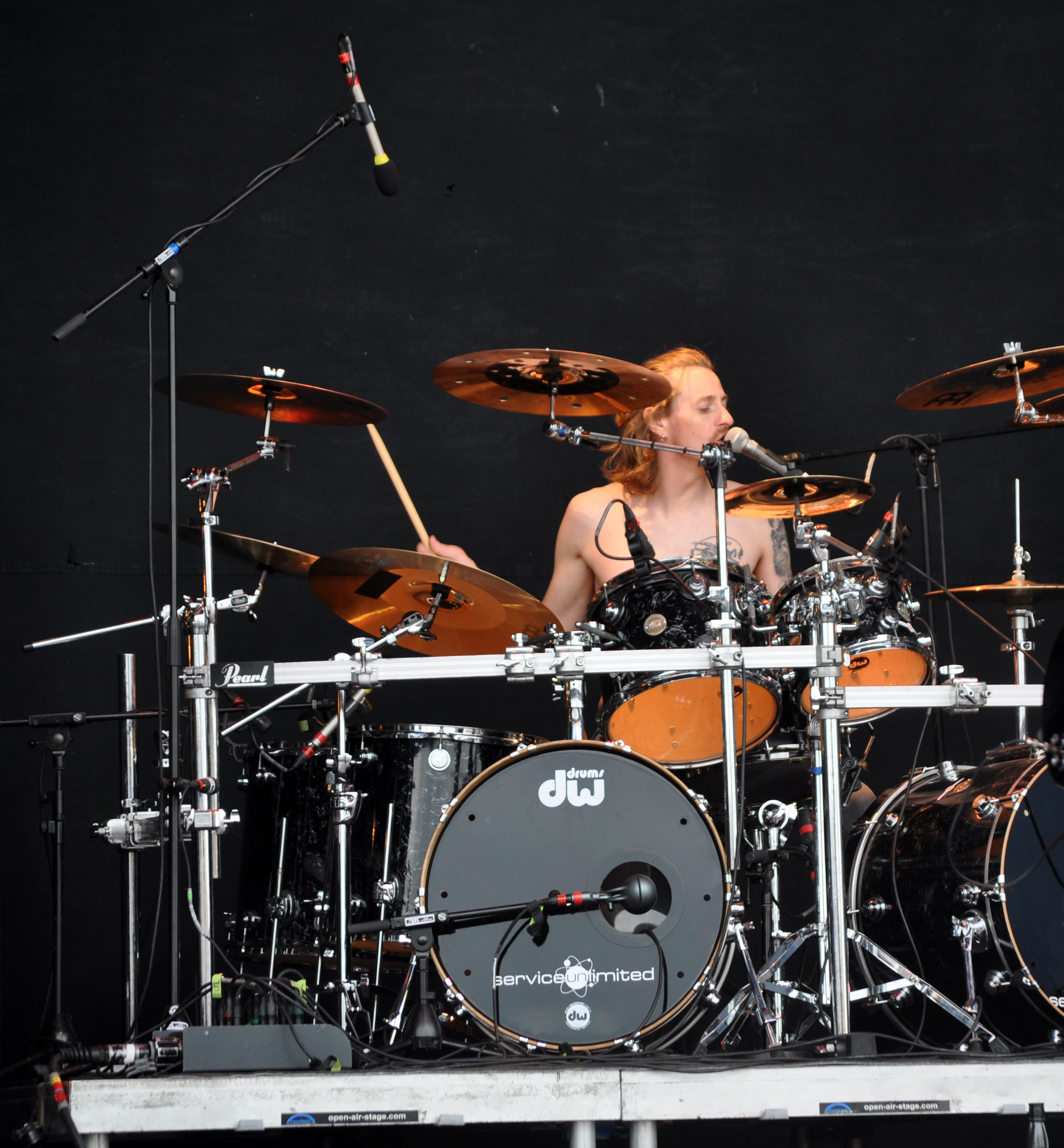
Jón Geir Jóhannsson

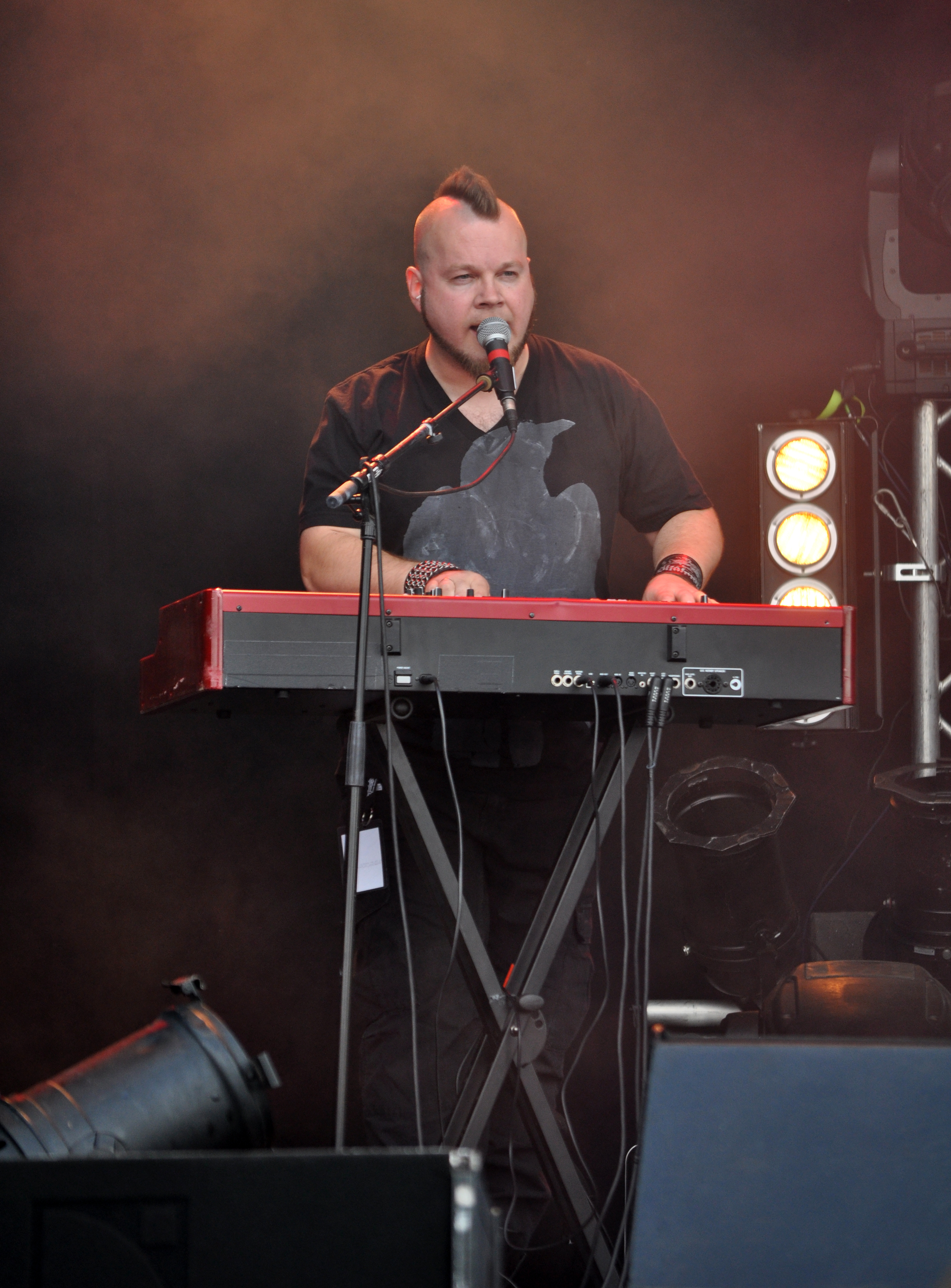
Gunnar Ben

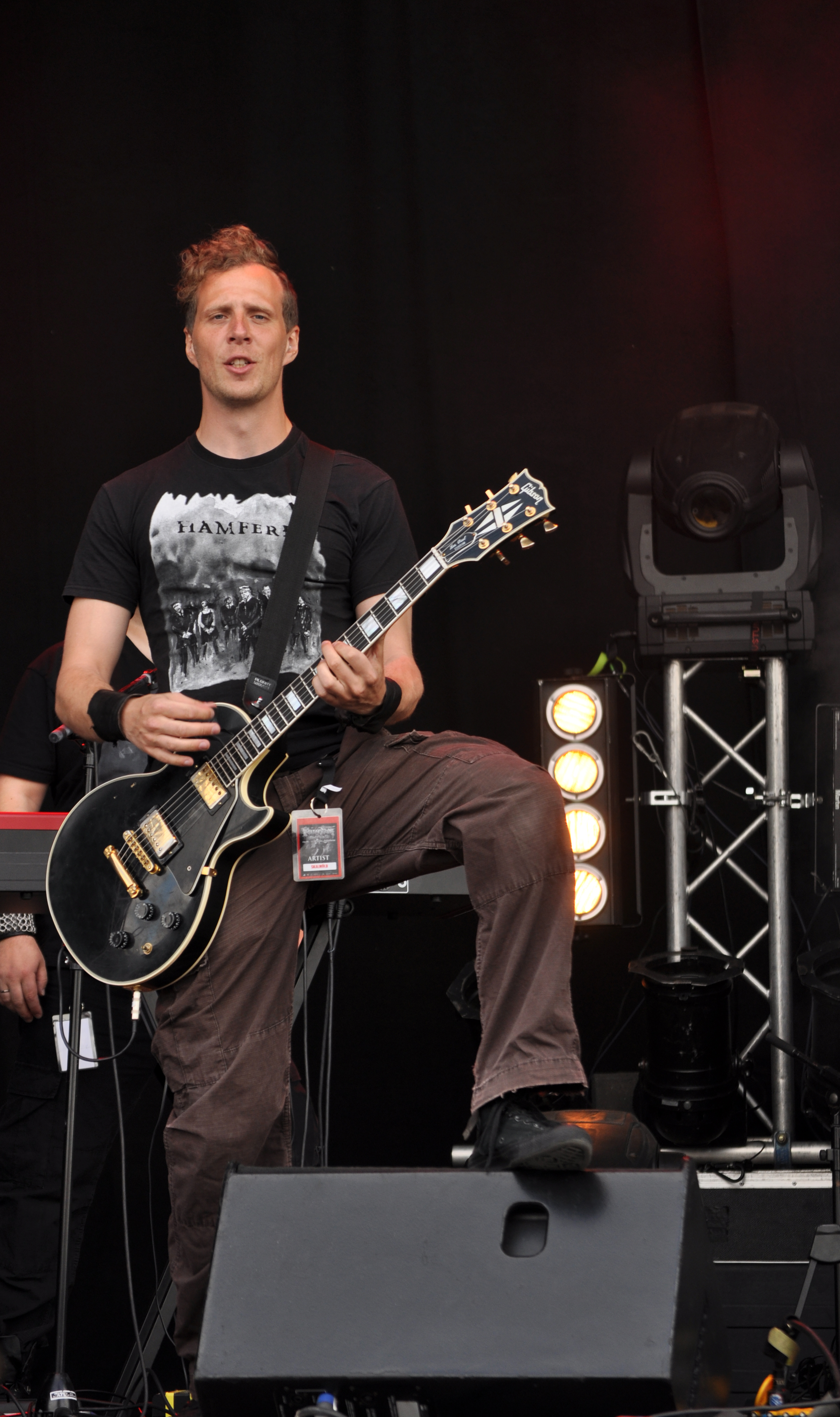
Baldur Ragnarsson

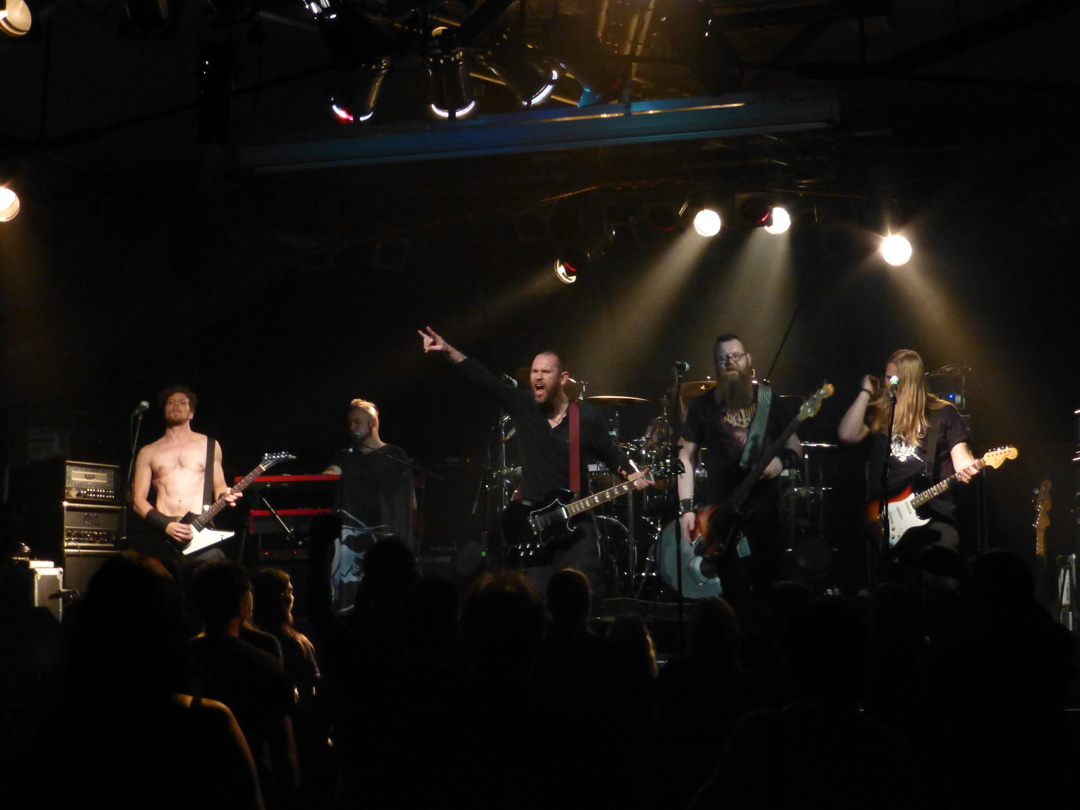
Skálmöld live at the Robin 2, Bilston, Wolverhampton in October 2013.
