= Nidhogg 2 =

2017 video game

- Developer: Messhof
- Publisher: Messhof
- Designer: Mark Essen
- Programmer: Mark Essen
- Artist: Toby Dixon
- Composer: Mux Mool
- Engine: GameMaker Studio
- Platforms: Windows macOS; PlayStation 4 Xbox One; Nintendo Switch; Arcade
- Release: Microsoft Windows, macOS, PlayStation 4: WW: August 15, 2017; Xbox One: WW: July 18, 2018; Nintendo Switch: WW: November 22, 2018
- Genre: Fighting
- Modes: Single-player, multiplayer

Nidhogg 2 is a 2017 fighting game developed and published by Messhof. It is the sequel to Nidhogg (2014), and was released for Microsoft Windows, macOS and PlayStation 4 in 2017, Xbox One in July 2018, and Nintendo Switch in November 2018. It expands on the original duelling gameplay introduced in its predecessor and features new weapons, actions and characters. The game received generally positive reviews from critics upon release.

== Gameplay ==
Nidhogg 2 is a fighting game in which two players duel against each other. The player has to reach the end of their opponent's side first to win. Players have a variety of moves, including sliding and leaping. They can deflect their opponents' attacks. Weapons, such as daggers, throwing knives and bows, as well as a character creator, are introduced.

== Development ==
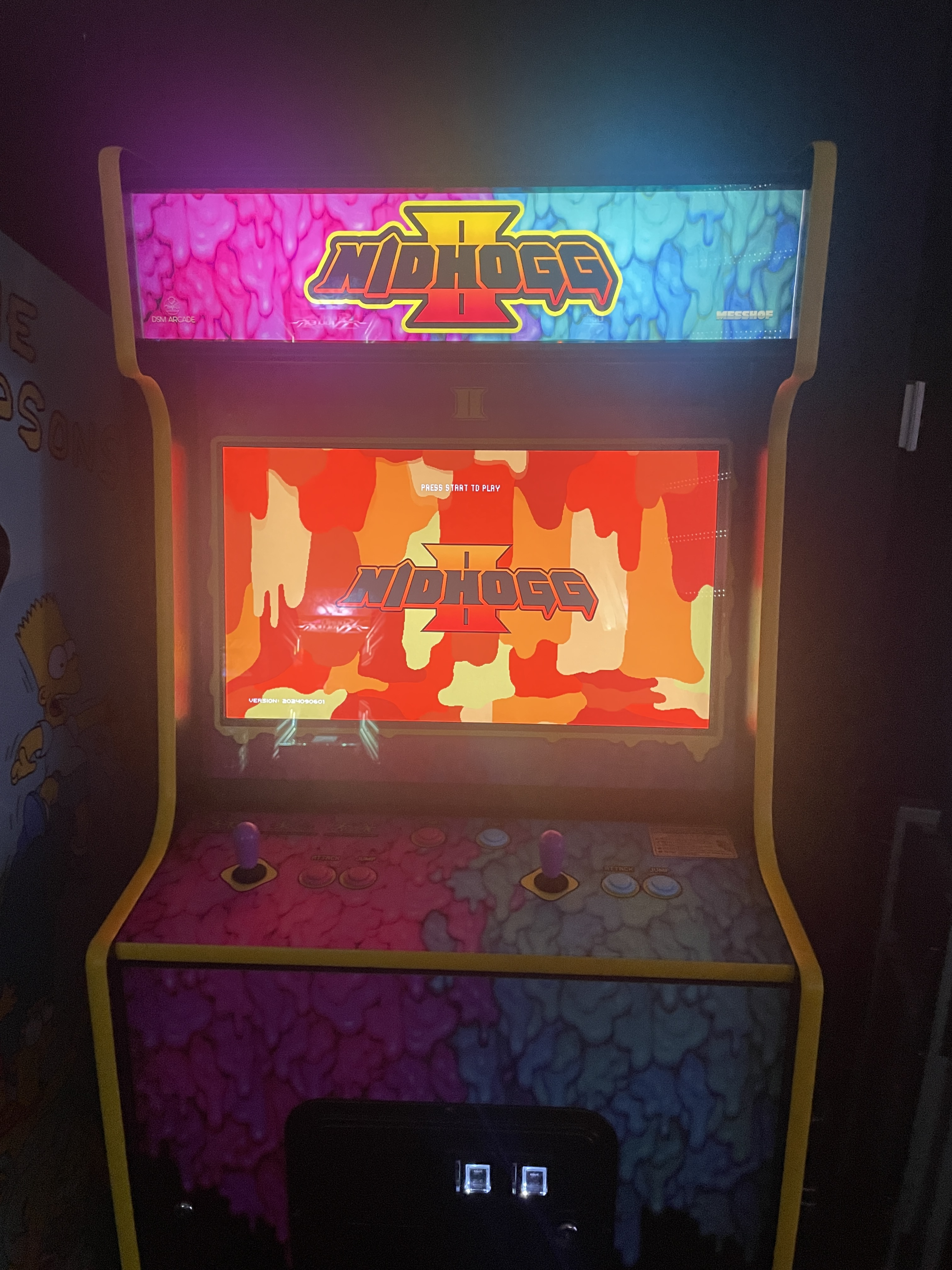
Nidhogg 2 arcade cabinet.

The title was announced in September 2016 and demonstrated at the 2016 TwitchCon and 2017 Electronic Entertainment Expo Indie Megabooth. It was released on August 15, 2017, on macOS, PlayStation 4, and Microsoft Windows platforms. A Nintendo Switch version was released on November 22, 2018. Unlike the original game, which features a minimalistic art style, the game's creator Mark Essen and artist Toby Dixon decided to use a more detailed graphical style with a higher resolution so as to reflect the game's increased depth. Another reason for the change is that Essen considered Nidhogg 2 a "spectator game". The art style allowed spectators to have more things to look at when they were watching the gameplay. In 2022, an arcade cabinet version of the game would be released by DSM Arcade for $5,999 USD.

== Reception ==
Reception

Aggregate score
Aggregator	Score
Metacritic	80/100

Review scores
Publication	Score
Game Informer	8/10
GamesMaster	80%
GamesTM	7/10
PlayStation Official Magazine – UK	7/10

The art style received a mixed reaction from fans following the game's announcement, which persisted after the game's release, with some being resentful of the art style while others embraced it. Nevertheless, the game received generally favorable reviews, according to the review aggregator website Metacritic. GamesMaster said it was "An excellent sword-fighting game that at times has trouble remembering its brilliant roots." Game Informer said, "Though it doesn't add much for players looking to play around with its improvements solo, Nidhogg 2 adds layers of depth to a simple formula without breaking what made it so appealing in the first place." Destructoid said, "It has expanded on the wonderful mechanics of the original and has one of the best soundtracks in recent memory. There isn't much content here for the solo player, but if you've got friends coming over for some friendly competition, the night would not be complete without Nidhogg 2." PlayStation Official Magazine – UK said it had "wicked local multiplayer appeal", while GamesTM said it was "Fast, intense, but flawed".

The game was nominated for "Best Fighting Game" and "Best Multiplayer" in IGN's Best of 2017 Awards.

=== Accolades ===
Year	Award	Category	Result	Ref.
2017	Golden Joystick Awards	Best Multiplayer	Nominated	
2017	The Game Awards 2017	Best Fighting Game	Nominated	
2018	21st Annual D.I.C.E. Awards	Fighting Game of the Year	Nominated	
2019	2019 Webby Awards	Best Multiplayer/Competitive Game	Nominated	
