= Niðavellir =

Home of the Dwarves in Norse Mythology

In Norse cosmology, Niðavellir (anglic. as Nidavellir) is the home of the Dwarves in Norse mythology.

== Etymology ==
Niðavellir is a probable compound of Old Norse Nið – "new moon", "the wane of the moon" (perhaps related to niðr – "down") + Vellir (pl. of völlr) – "fields": Dark Fields, Downward Fields). It is also called Myrkheimr (Myrkheimr, Old Norse compound of myrkr – "darkness" + heimr – "home": the world of darkness, Dark Abode).

== Mythology ==
It is mentioned in the Völuspá:

Stóð fyr norðan, / á Niðavöllom / salr úr gulli / Sindra ættar

(Stood to the north, a dark field, Halls of gold, Sindri's Clan").

One interpretation of the above verse would read like this:

Before you reach the north (Niflheim being the world furthest to the north), A dark dwelling stands (The dwarf world), In halls of gold, Sindri's bloodline lives.

Sindri was a famous dwarf, and ættar means bloodline, or in this case most likely kin or tribe.

Niðavellir has often been interpreted as one of the Nine Worlds of Norse legend. Nidavellir is also referred to as Svartalfheim, and was home to dwarfs or 'Dark elves' called Dökkálfar. The dwarfs' world is mentioned in the Prose Edda by Snorri Sturluson as Svartálfaheimr.

== See also ==
- Brokkr
- Eitri

== Other sources ==
- Faulkes, Anthony (trans. and ed.) (1987) Edda of Snorri Sturluson (Everyman's Library) ISBN 0-460-87616-3
- Lindow, John (2001) Handbook of Norse mythology (Santa Barbara: ABC-Clio) ISBN 1-57607-217-7
- Orchard, Andy (1997) Dictionary of Norse Myth and Legend (Cassell) ISBN 0-304-34520-2
- Simek, Rudolf (2007) translated by Angela Hall. Dictionary of Northern Mythology (D.S. Brewer) ISBN 0-85991-513-1
