= Nidhogg (video game) =

2014 video game

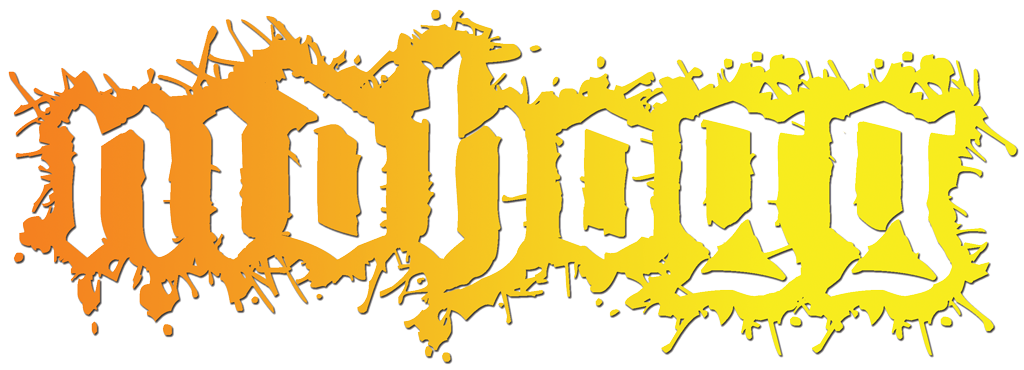
- Developer: Messhof (Note: Ported to PlayStation 4 and PlayStation Vita by Code Mystics)
- Publisher: Messhof
- Designer: Mark Essen
- Programmer: Mark Essen
- Artists: Mark Essen; Kristy Norindr
- Composer: Daedelus
- Engine: GameMaker Studio
- Platforms: Windows, OS X, PlayStation 4, PlayStation Vita
- Release: Microsoft Windows; January 13, 2014; OS X; May 19, 2014; PS4, PS Vita; October 14, 2014
- Genre: Fighting
- Modes: Single-player, multiplayer

Nidhogg is a side-scrolling two-player fighting video game developed and published by Messhof. Players duel with swords in a pixelated environment. The game was commissioned for the New York University Game Center's annual multiplayer show, and was revised and demoed at private events over the next four years before its final release. It won Indiecade 2013's Game Design award and the 2011 Independent Games Festival's Nuovo Award. It was released for Microsoft Windows on January 13, 2014, and later ported to OS X, PlayStation 4, and PlayStation Vita. Critics praised the feel of the gameplay and its balance, but considered its single-player mode unsatisfying. Messhof released a sequel in 2017 with a higher resolution art style and additional weapons and arenas.

== Gameplay ==
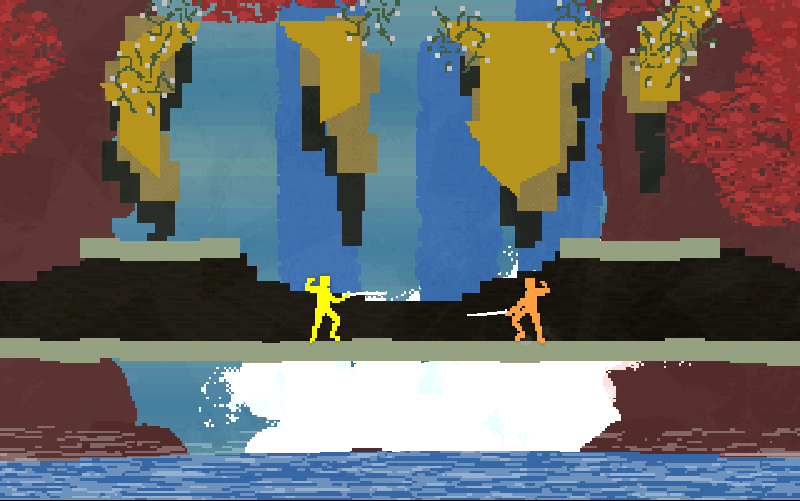
Gameplay screenshot

Animated gameplay

Nidhogg is a fast-paced two-player dueling game where two players sword fight in a side-scrolling environment. Players can run, jump, slide, throw their swords, and fistfight. The player-character's sword can be held at three different heights: low, medium, and high, and changing the sword's position to hit the opponent's sword will disarm the opponent. Players can also dive kick, wall jump, climb ledges, and crawl. The player continually pushes towards one side of the screen, such that they are permitted a few seconds to run towards their opponent's side while their opponent respawns after dying. The player to reach the end of their opponent's side first wins and is eaten by the mythological Norse serpent Níðhöggr. Nidhogg has four different levels and single-player, local multiplayer, and online multiplayer two-player modes. The game also has a tournament mode and game variants including "boomerang swords". It can be played via a shared keyboard, and its art style has a pixelated aesthetic similar to games of the 1980s, with vivid colors and simple graphics.

== Development ==
Inspired by the 1984 fighting game Great Swordsman, the game was made by indie developer Mark Essen over the course of four years, using GameMaker Studio. It was commissioned for the New York University Game Center's first No Quarter annual multiplayer show and first exhibited in April 2010 as Raging Hadron. The game was delayed as Messhof planned a formal release and later renamed Nidhogg, after the mythological Norse serpent who appears in-game. Messhof worked as the game's only programmer and his time was divided between development and his other freelance and personal projects, graduate school, and a job teaching at University of Southern California. The game languished until Kristina "Kristy" Norindr assisted Essen in founding Messhof LLC, a legally incorporated indie studio, joining as a co-founder and working in a business development role. (Note: Norindr had previously been a project manager at Meteor Games and a research manager at the University of Southern California Game Innovation Lab.) She led the search for the game's musician. Their list of desired styles always included Daedelus, who they were able to contact through a mutual friend who attended high school with the musician. Daedelus designed some of the procedural elements that trigger the music sequences. Messhof described their process as wanting to "enhance the action" while letting players control the game's tension. He felt lucky to have Daedelus as his composer. Messhof also asked a former student to help him complete the game's netcode, which he deemed to be "totally essential" for the game's future as an eSport. He read about "programming and fighting game structure" over the course of development, which he credited as important towards the game's progress. It was his first attempt at networked multiplayer.

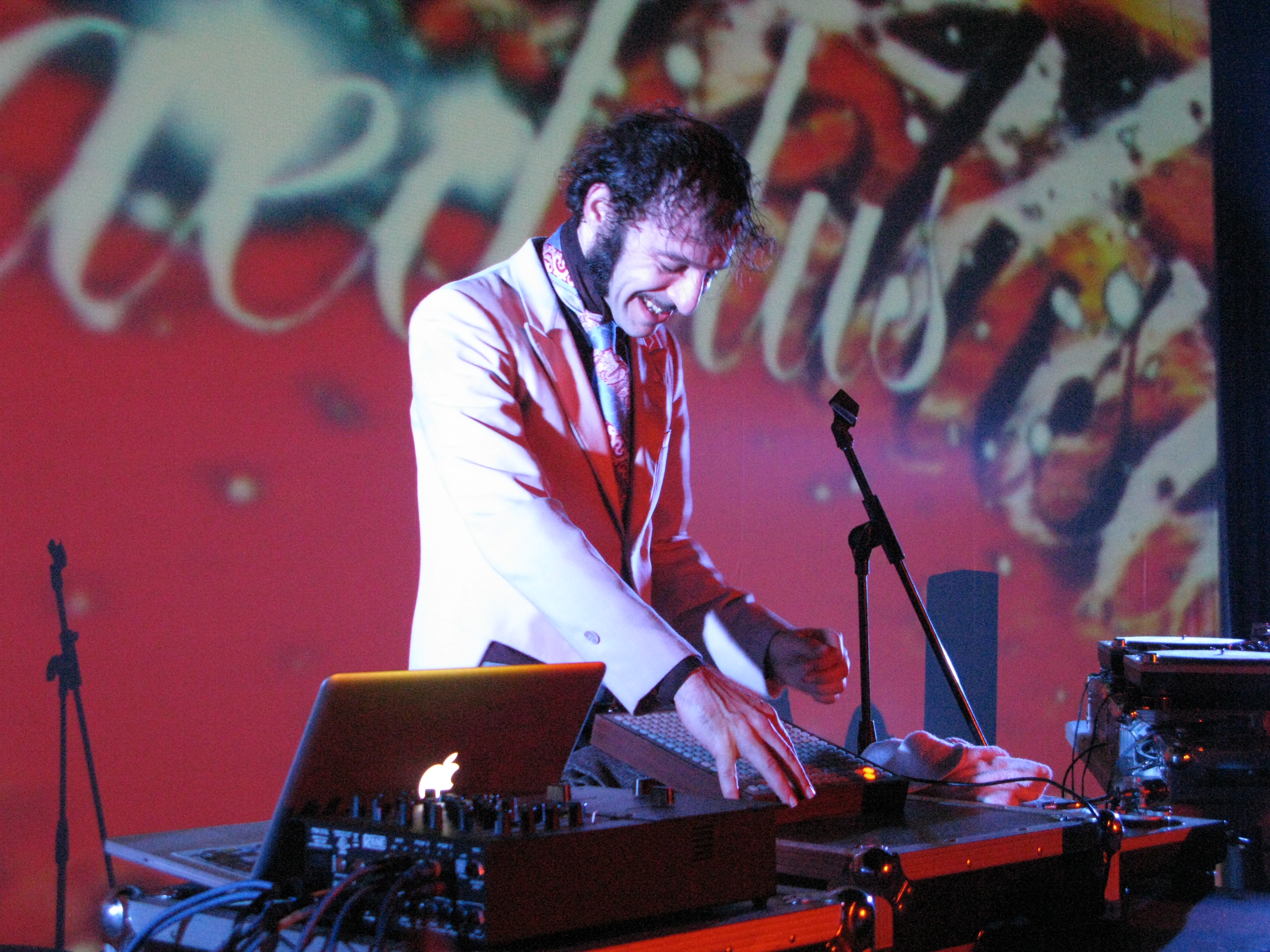
Daedelus composed the game's soundtrack.

The core concept did not change over the course of development, though the other content did. Messhof limited the game's exposure during this time as he wanted the game to be respected in the fighting game genre and wanted to make sure it was ready first. Messhof himself, however, did not have much experience in this genre. He said that he "spent a lot of time" on the gameplay's feel and designed it to play slowly, where players wait for their opponent to move first, similar to Bushido Blade. He also spent time adding divekicks and cartwheels while improving the melee attacks and spectator experience. Some moves, such as a Yoshi-style "ground pound" and the Karate Kid crane kick, were attempted and removed. In testing, he would observe players and their strategies before attempting to write an artificial intelligence to use similar strategies. Messhof considers the single-player to be training for the online multiplayer, and the online multiplayer training for live matches. He described his process as making "the most fun game" to play with his friends.

Gamasutra's Mike Rose wrote that the game became "the equivalent of a video game fable" for its appearance at video game shows but lack of public release. It won several awards within a year of its first showing and appeared at "hyper-local indie group" meetups such as the Hand Eye Society of Toronto and Juegos Rancheros. A playable demo of the game was displayed at the 2013 Evolution Championship Series, with upgrades from previous demos of the game. The next year, the game was selected for the July 2014 Evolution Championship Series fighting game tournament's Indie Showcase. Messhof said that the game works best in live, public settings. Nidhogg was released on January 13, 2014, for Microsoft Windows via Steam. The release includes online competition and an eight-person tournament mode. A port for OS X was later released on May 19, 2014, and ports for PlayStation 4 and PlayStation Vita, developed by Code Mystics, on October 14, 2014. The Fencer later went on to appear as a playable character in the indie fighting game Divekick.

== Reception ==
Reception

Aggregate score
Aggregator	Score
Metacritic	81/100

Review scores
Publication	Score
Destructoid	90%
Edge	9/10
Eurogamer	9/10
Game Informer	7.5/10
GameRevolution	70%
GamesMaster	90%
GamesTM	80%
IGN	9/10
PlayStation Official Magazine – UK	9/10
PC Gamer (UK)	93%
Polygon	8/10
VideoGamer.com	90%

Nidhogg received "generally favorable" reviews, according to video game review score aggregator Metacritic. Reviewers praised the feel of the gameplay and its balance, and thought the single-player mode to be unsatisfying. Some critics found technical issues with the online multiplayer code, while others only had issues finding other players.

Brandon Boyer marked the game as part of a "multiplayer renaissance" alongside TowerFall and Samurai Gunn. Polygon's Russ Frushtick described the game as a tug-of-war closer to the National Football League than to Street Fighter. He commended the game's originality. Kyle Hilliard of Game Informer did not think the pixelated graphics were sufficiently "distinct" from similar games. He praised the soundtrack but wanted more tracks.

Eurogamer's Quintin Smith praised the game's balance, writing that "every single fight is hold-your-breath tense", that even the shortest fights "take on an air of majesty", and that kills feel fair. He described the game as multiplayer "theatre" for the impact the game has on those watching and playing it. Destructoid summarised the game as "Nidhogg stands as one of the true kings of competitive gameplay, and that doesn't need to be patched one bit", while GamesMaster said "A peculiar, thrilling and essential addition to your PC games collection. Best played with friends/enemies." Rock, Paper, Shotgun's Alec Meer described the game as a combination of "precision and reckless abandon". IGN's Keza MacDonald called it the "most exhilarating competitive game [she had] played in years". Edge put the game alongside Street Fighter II, Super Smash Bros., and GoldenEye 007 as games "written into history indelibly for their competitive multiplayer". The game later inspired indie games such as TowerFall and Samurai Gunn. Sean Hollister of The Verge described Nidhogg as "perfect".

Regarding the overall proposition, GamesTM said "It's a small package but there's a wealth of value to be found in the creative gameplay that'll spur you through many hours of gaming", while PC Gamer said "A brilliant marriage of mechanics, level design and music that will be played and talked about for years to come", a sentiment echoed by VideoGamer, who said "Nidhogg is a game to be enjoyed with friends while in the same room together, and it may be the best title you play that way this year."

=== Awards ===
It won Indiecade 2013's Game Design award and the 2011 Independent Games Festival's Nuovo Award, where it was also nominated for Excellence in Design and the Seumas McNally Grand Prize. It was IGN's January 2014 Game of the Month, and Rock, Paper, Shotgun awarded the game their first physical trophy. During the 18th Annual D.I.C.E. Awards, the Academy of Interactive Arts & Sciences nominated Nidhogg for "Fighting Game of the Year". Paste and Rock, Paper, Shotgun named Nidhogg among the best games of the 2010s decade.

=== Sequel ===
In August 2017, Messhof released a sequel, Nidhogg 2, for macOS, PlayStation 4, and Windows platforms. The sequel adds to its predecessor's core game mechanics and adds a colorful, higher resolution art style, additional weapons, and ten arenas.
