= Nanna (Norse deity) =

Norse goddess

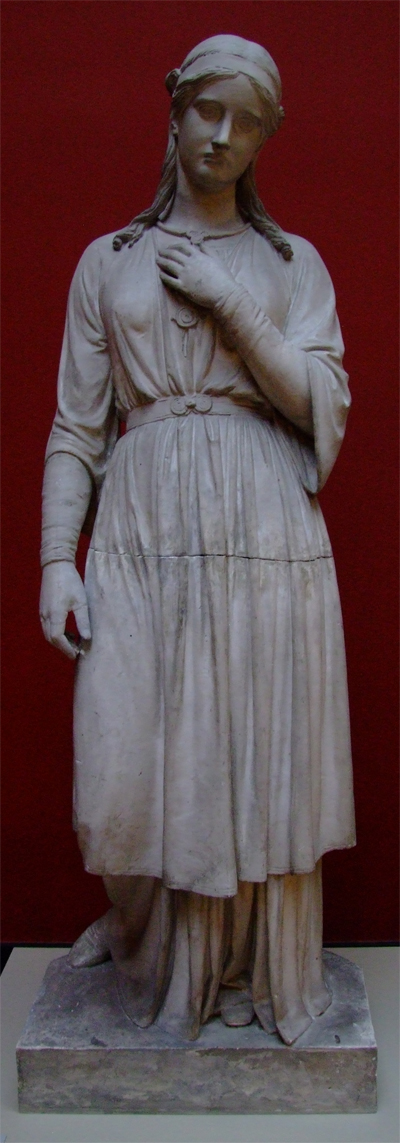
Nanna (1857) by Herman Wilhelm Bissen.

In Norse mythology, Nanna or Nána is a goddess associated with devotion, peace and harmony. Accounts of Nanna vary greatly by source. In the Prose Edda, written in the 13th century by Snorri Sturluson, Nanna is married with the god Baldr and the couple produced a son, the god Forseti.

== Mythology ==
After Baldr's death, Nanna dies of grief. Nanna is placed on Baldr's ship with his corpse and the two are set aflame and pushed out to sea. In Hel, Baldr and Nanna are united again. In an attempt to bring back Baldr from the dead, the god Hermóðr rides to Hel and, upon receiving the hope of resurrection from the goddess Hel, Nanna gives Hermóðr gifts to give to the goddess Frigg (a robe of linen), the goddess Fulla (a finger-ring), and for others (unspecified). Nanna is frequently mentioned in the poetry of skalds and a Nanna, who may or may not be the same figure, is mentioned once in the Poetic Edda, compiled in the 13th century from earlier traditional sources.

An account provided by Saxo Grammaticus in his 12th century work Gesta Danorum euhemerises Nanna as a human female, the daughter of King Gevar, and the love interest of both the demi-god Baldr and the human Höðr. Spurred by their mutual attraction to Nanna, Baldr and Höðr repeatedly do battle. Nanna is only interested in Höðr and weds him, while Baldr wastes away from nightmares about Nanna.

The Setre Comb, a comb from the 6th or early 7th century has runic inscriptions engraved, which may reference the goddess.

The etymology of the name Nanna is a subject of scholarly debate. Scholars have debated connections between Nanna and other similarly named deities from other cultures, and the implications of the goddess' attestations.

== Etymology and place names ==
The etymology of the name of the goddess Nanna is debated: Some scholars have proposed that the name may derive from a babble word, nanna, meaning "mother". Scholar J. de Vries connects the name Nanna to the root *nanþ-, leading to "the daring one". Lindow (2001) theorizes that a common noun may have existed in Old Norse, nanna, that roughly meant "woman". (Note: Etymology references: For "babble word" etymology, see; For J. de Vries' root theory, see; For Lindow's common noun theory, see) McKinnell (2005) notes that the "mother" and *nanþ- derivations may not be distinct, commenting that nanna may have once meant "she who empowers".

== Attestations ==
=== Poetic Edda ===
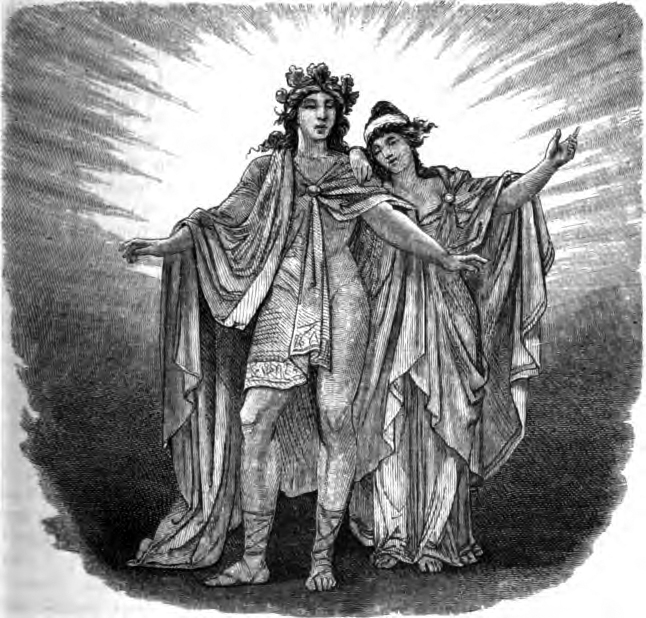
Baldr and Nanna (1882) by Friedrich Wilhelm Heine

In the Poetic Edda poem Hyndluljóð, a figure by the name of Nanna is listed as the daughter of Nökkvi and as a relative of Óttar. This figure may or may not be the same Nanna as Baldr's wife.

=== Prose Edda ===
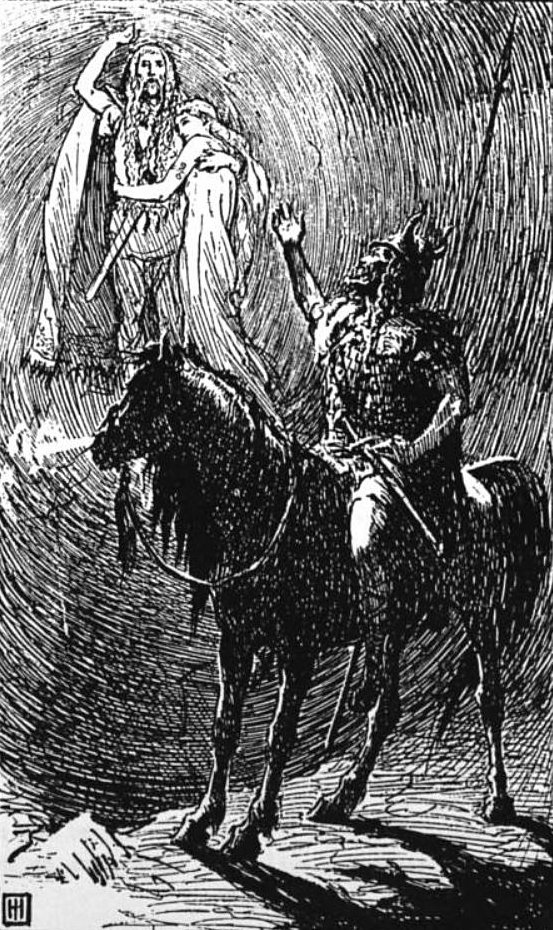
In Hel Baldr, holding Nanna, waves to Hermóðr (1893) by George Percy Jacomb-Hood

In chapter 38 of the Prose Edda book Gylfaginning, the enthroned figure of "High" explains that Nanna Nepsdóttir (the last name meaning "Nepr's daughter") and her husband Baldr produced a son, the god Forseti.

Later in Gylfaginning (chapter 49), "High" recounts Baldr's death in Asgard at the unwitting hands of his blind brother, Höðr. Baldr's body is taken to the seaside and, when his body is placed unto his ship Hringhorni, Nanna collapses and dies of grief. Her body is placed upon Hringhorni with Baldr's, the ship is set aflame, and the god Thor hallows the pyre with his hammer Mjölnir.

Sent by Baldr's mother, the goddess Frigg, the god Hermóðr rides to the place Hel to resurrect Baldr. Hermóðr finally arrives in Hel to find Baldr in a hall, seated in the seat of honor and with his wife Nanna. Hermóðr bargains with the goddess Hel for Baldr's resurrection. Hel and Hermóðr come to an agreement and then Baldr and Nanna accompany Hermóðr out of the hall.

Baldr gives Hermóðr the ring Draupnir, which his father Odin had placed on Baldr's pyre, to return to Odin. Nanna presents to Hermóðr a series of gifts: A linen robe for Frigg, a golden ring for the goddess Fulla, and other unspecified items. Hermóðr returns to Asgard.

In the first chapter of the Prose Edda book "Skáldskaparmál", Nanna is listed among 8 goddesses attending a feast held in honor of Ægir.

In chapter 5 of "Skáldskaparmál", means of referring to Baldr include "husband of Nanna". In chapter 19, means of referring to Frigg include "mother-in-law of Nanna". In chapter 75, Nanna is listed among goddesses. In chapter 18, the skald Eilífr Goðrúnarson's work Þórsdrápa is quoted, which includes a kenning that references Nanna ("wake-hilt-Nanna" for "troll-wife").

=== Gesta Danorum ===
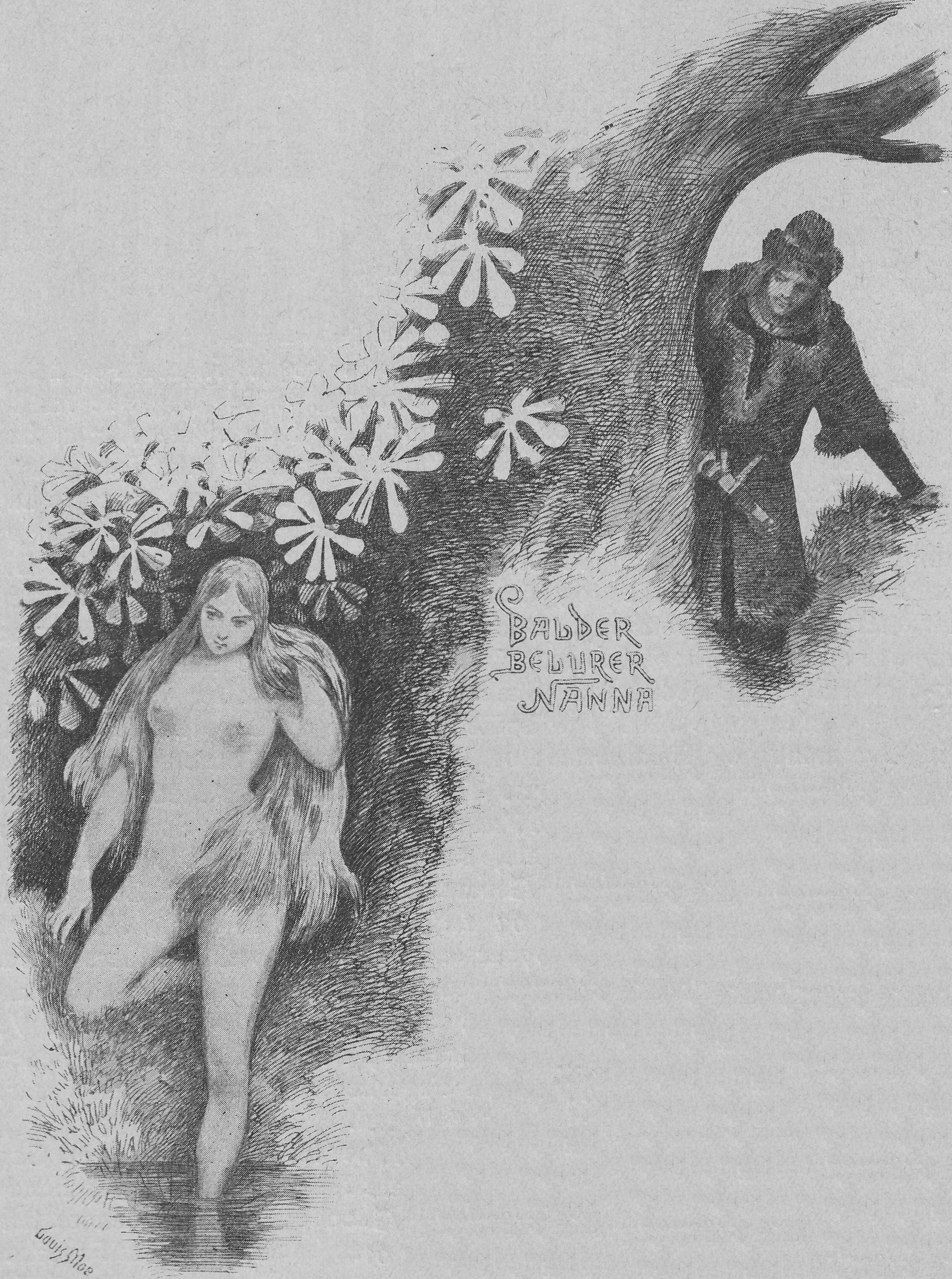
Baldr secretly watches Nanna bathing (1898) by Louis Moe

In book III of Gesta Danorum, Nanna is not a goddess, but rather a daughter of the mortal King Gevar. Nanna is attracted to her foster-brother Höðr (here, also a human), son of Hothbrodd, and "seeks his embraces". One day, Baldr, who Saxo describes as the son of the god Odin, witnesses Nanna bathing and lusts for her; "the sheen of her graceful body inflamed him, and her manifest charms seared his heart – for there is no stronger incitement to lust than beauty." Fearing that Höðr will be an obstacle for his acquisition of Nanna, Baldr resolves to slay Höðr.

While out hunting, Höðr loses his path in a mist and a group of forest maidens greet him by name. The maidens tell him that they are able to guide fate, and that they appear invisibly on battlefields, where they award victory or defeat at their whim. They inform Höðr that Baldr witnessed Nanna bathing, yet warn Höðr not to challenge Baldr to combat – no matter what he may do – for Baldr sprang from divine seed and is therefore a demi-god. The maidens and their dwelling vanish, and Höðr finds himself standing on an open plain. (Saxo explains that Höðr had been tricked by means of magic.)

When Höðr returns home he recounts to King Gevar that he had lost his path and been tricked by the forest maidens, and immediately asks King Gevar for his daughter Nanna's hand in wedlock. Gevar tells Höðr that he would most certainly approve of the marriage, but that Baldr had already requested Nanna's hand. Gevar says that he fears Baldr's wrath, for Baldr's body is infused with a holy strength, because his father Odin is a god, and hence Baldr cannot be harmed by steel. However, Gevar knows of a sword that can kill Baldr, and he explains that it is very well protected, and tells Höðr how to acquire the sword. (Note: Höðr acquires the sword in a series of adventures Baldr and Nanna are not involved in.)

While Höðr is off on adventures, obtaining a sword to kill Baldr, Baldr marches armed into Gevar's kingdom and claims Nanna. Gevar tells Baldr to reason with Nanna, and Baldr does this with some diplomacy. Despite Baldr's careful efforts at wooing Nanna, he makes no progress; Nanna dodges his advances by arguing that due to their different natures, the offspring of a deity cannot marry a mortal.

Höðr learns of Baldr's actions, and joins forces with Helgi, together they battle with Baldr and his allied gods. (Note: The gods fighting on Baldr's behalf include Thor and Odin, but are otherwise not named.) The result is victory for Höðr's forces. After the victory, Höðr again asks Gevar for Nanna's hand and so wins Nanna's embraces. Höðr and Nanna go to Sweden and there Höðr becomes ruler.

In Sweden, Höðr is attacked by Baldr, and in this second engagement Höðr is defeated. He and Nanna flee together back to Denmark. Despite his ostensible victory, Baldr is tormented at night by vivid dreams of Nanna, that distraction from restful sleep results in Baldr's deterioration:

"[Baldr] was incessantly tormented at night by phantoms which mimicked the shape of Nanna and caused him to fall into such an unhealthy condition that he could not even walk properly. For this reason he took to travelling in a chariot or carriage."
"The violent passion that soaked his heart brought him almost to the verge of collapse. He judged that victory had yielded him nothing, since it had not won him Nanna as a prize."

The family tree of legendary Kings of the Danes, according to the Gesta Danorum (Books I to VII)

Kings of the Danes are in bold and marked with a crown (♕). Kings of the Swedes are marked with a dagger (†). Superscript numbers before a name indicate in which books of Gesta Danorum the individual is mentioned.

^{(1)} Humble
KEY
^{(1)} Angul	^{(1)} **Dan** ♕	^{(1)} Grytha	Marriage or coupling
Parent and child
The Angles	^{(1)} **Humble** ♕	^{(1)} **Lother** ♕	^{(1)} King of the Saxons	Succession by other or unclear means
^{(1)} Roar
^{(1)} Sigtryg, King of the Swedes†	^{(1)} **Skiold** ♕	^{(1)} Alfhild
^{(1)} daughter of Roar	^{(1)} Bess
^{(1)} sister of Gram	^{(1)} Gróa	^{(1)} **Gram** ♕†	^{(1)} Sumble, King of the Finns
^{(1)} Wagnhofde
^{(1)} Signe	^{(1)} Henry, King of the Saxons	^{(1)} Hakon, King of the Nitherians
^{(1)} Hardgrep
^{(1)} **Swipdag** ♕†, King of Norway	^{(1)} sister of Guthorm	^{(1)} **Guthorm** ♕	^{(1,2,5)} **Hadding** ♕	^{(1)} Ragnhild
^{(1)} Asmund†	^{(1)} Gunnhild	^{(1)} Guthorm
^{(1,2)} Ulfhild	^{(2)} **Ubbe** ♕
^{(1)} Henry	^{(1)} Uffe†	^{(1,2)} Hunding†	^{(2)} Thorhild	^{(2)} Scot
^{(1)} daughter of Uffe	^{(2)} Ragnar†	^{(2)} Swanhwid	^{(2)} sisters of Swanhwid	^{(2)} Handwan
^{(2)} Thorwald
^{(2,5)} **Frode** ♕	^{(2)} daughter of Handwan
^{(2,3)} Hothbrodd†	^{(2)} **Halfdan** ♕	^{(2)} Ro	^{(2)} Skat
^{(2)} Thora
^{(2,3)} **Helge** ♕	^{(2)} **Ro** ♕
^{(2,3)} Athisl†	^{(2)} Urse
^{(2,3)} King Gewar	^{(2,3)} **Rolf** Krage ♕†	^{(2)} Rute	^{(2)} Bjarke	^{(2)} Skulde	^{(2,3)} **Hiartuar** †♕
^{(2,3)} **Hother** †♕	^{(3)} Nanna	^{(3)} Herlek	^{(3)} Gerit
^{(3)} former King of Britain	^{(3)} mother of the King of Britain	^{(3)} a slave	^{(3)} a bondmaid	^{(3)} **Rorik** Slyngebond ♕	^{(3)} Gerwendil
^{(3,4)} King of Britain	^{(3,4)} Queen of Britain	^{(3,4)} Gerutha	^{(3,4)} Horwendil	^{(3,4)} Feng
^{(3,4)} foster sister of Amleth	^{(3,4)} daughter of the King of Britain	^{(3,4)} Amleth	^{(4)} Hermutrude, Queen of Scotland	^{(4)} **Wiglek** ♕
^{(4)} son of Amleth	^{(4)} **Wermund** ♕	^{(4)} Frowin, governor of Sleswik
^{(4)} **Uffe** ♕, aka Olaf the Gentle	^{(4)} daughter of Frowin	^{(4)} Ket	^{(4)} Wig
^{(4)} **Dan** ♕
^{(4)} **Hugleik** ♕
^{(4)} **Frode** the Vigorous ♕
^{(4)} **Dan** ♕
^{(5)} Kraka	^{(5)} Ragnar	^{(5)} Brak	^{(4,5)} **Fridleif** the Swift ♕	^{(5)} Hun, King of the Huns	^{(5)} Hun
^{(5)} Gotar, King of Norway	^{(5)} Westmar	^{(5)} Koll	^{(5)} Gotwar
^{(5)} Roller	^{(5,6)} Erik† Shrewd-spoken	^{(5)} Gunwar the Fair	^{(5)} Alfhild	^{(5,6)} **Frode** ♕	^{(5)} Hanund	^{(5)} Grep (eldest of three)	^{(5)} 11 other sons (two named Grep)
^{(6)} Hythin, King of Tellemark	^{(5)} Alf	^{(5)} Eyfura	^{(5)} Arngrim	^{(6)} Grubb	^{(6)} **Hiarn** ♕	^{(6)} Amund, King of Norway
^{(6)} child of Hythin	^{(6)} Halfdan†	^{(5)} 12 sons, including Anganty	^{(6)} Ane	^{(6)} Juritha	^{(6)} **Fridleif** ♕	^{(6)} Frogertha
^{(6)} Hanef, King of Saxony	^{(6)} Swerting, King of Saxony	^{(6)} Olaf	^{(6)} **Frode** ♕
^{(6,7)} Siward†	^{(6)} sons of Swerting	^{(6)} sister of the sons of Swerting	^{(6,7)} **Ingild** ♕	^{(6)} Helga	^{(6)} Helge	^{(6)} Asa
^{(6,7)} Frode	^{(6,7)} Fridleif	^{(6,7)} Ingild	^{(6,7)} **Olaf** ♕	^{(7)} Karl, governor of Gothland
^{(7)} Ulfhild	^{(7)} **Frode** ♕	^{(7)} Hather, a chief	^{(7)} **Harald** ♕	^{(7)} Signe
^{(7)} Erik†	^{(7)} Thorhild	^{(7)} **Halfdan** Biargramm ♕†	^{(7)} Harald
^{(7)} Asmund
Kings of Norway

Name spellings are derived from Oliver Elton's 1905 translation, The First Nine Books of the Danish History of Saxo Grammaticus, via Wikisource.

=== Gesta Danorum på danskæ ===
In Gesta Danorum på danskæ, an Old Danish chronicle based in part on Gesta Danorum, the tale of Hother killing Balder is told very briefly. Nanna also appears, but is not connected to the story of Hother and Balder. Instead, she is the queen of Hother's grandson, King Wighlek.

The family tree of legendary Kings of the Danes, according to Gesta Danorum på danskæ (extract)

Kings of the Danes are marked with a crown (♕).

♕ Halfdan ♂	Ro ♂	Skat ♂	KEY
Marriage or coupling
♕ Ro or Halfdan ♂	♕ Helghe ♂	Thore ♀	Parent and child
Succession by other means
♕ A dog king ♂	Yrse ♀
♕ Snio ♂	♕ Rolf Krage ♂	Skulda ♀	♕ Hartwar ♂
Hodbrod ♂	Hadding's daughter ♀
♕ Hother ♂
♕ Rorik Slengeborre, also called Rake ♂	Rorik's sister ♀	Orwendel ♂	Feng ♂
King of Britain's daughter ♀	Amblothe ♂	Queen of Scotland ♀
♕ Wighlek ♂	Nanna ♀
♕ Wermund ♂
♕ Offe the Strong ♂

The source used for the genealogical information and name spellings is the English translation provided by Peter Tunstall.

== Archaeological record ==
The Setre Comb, a comb from the 6th or early 7th century has runic inscriptions which may refer to the goddess. The comb is the subject of an amount of scholarly discourse as most experts accept the reading of the Germanic charm word alu and Nanna; whether the Nanna engraved on the comb is the same as the goddess Nanna from the Eddas is questioned by some scholars.

== Reception ==
Some scholars have attempted to link Old Norse Nanna with the Sumerian name of the goddess Inanna (Note: Sumerian Inanna was anciently equated with the Babylonian goddess Ishtar.) or the Phrygian goddess Nana. (Note: Phrygian goddess Nana was the mother of the god Attis, the self-castrated consort of Κυβέλη (Kubelë).)

Scholar Simek (2007) opines that identification with Inanna, Nannar, or Nana is "hardly likely" since they were so widely separated in time and place. Davidson (2008) agrees and says that while "the idea of a link with Sumerian Inanna, 'Lady of Heaven', was attractive to early scholars" the notion "seems unlikely".
