= Hyrrokkin =

Figure in Nordic mythology

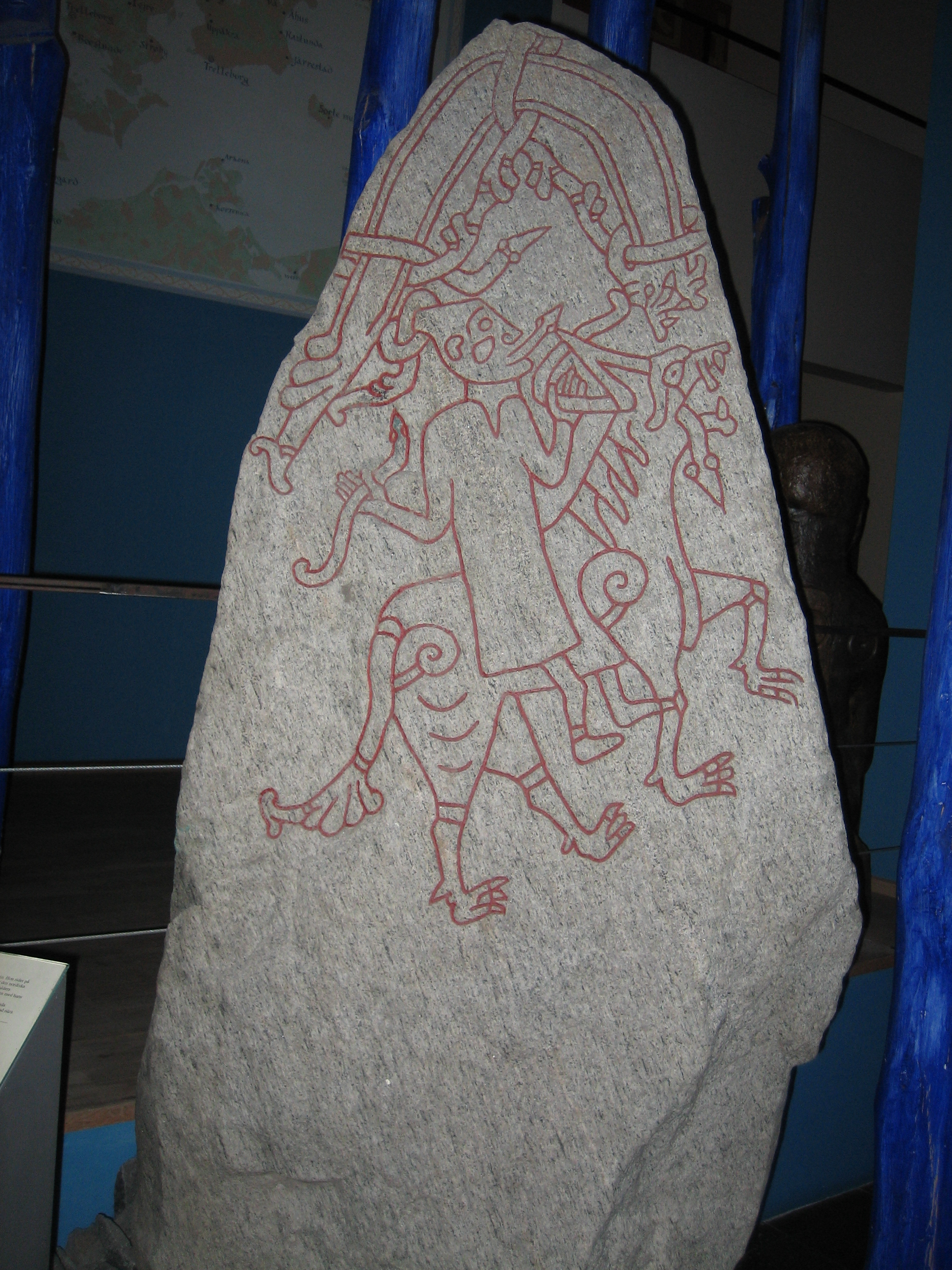
It is believed that Hyrrokkin is featured on the stone DR 284 (Hunnestad 3), depicting an animal ridden by a woman with two snakes in her hands.

Hyrrokkin (Old Norse: [ˈhyrˌrokːenː]) is a female jötunn in Norse mythology. According to 13th-century poet Snorri Sturluson, she launched the largest of all ships at Baldr's funeral after the Æsir gods were unable to budge the vessel.

Hyrrokkin was a relatively important figure in the last decades of paganism in Iceland. She appears to be depicted on one of the DR 284 stones from the Hunnestad Monument near Marsvinsholm, Sweden.

== Name ==
The Old Norse name Hyrrokkin has been translated as 'fire-withered' or 'fire-steamer'. According to linguist Jan de Vries, it is a compound formed with the root hyr- ('fire') attached to hrokkinn ('curly; wrinkle'). Scholar John Lindow has proposed the translation 'fire-smoked', perhaps referring to a dark, shrivelled appearance.

== Attestations ==
=== Prose Edda ===
It is told in Snorri Sturluson's Gylfaginning that at Baldr's funeral his wife Nanna died of grief and was placed alongside him on his pyre, thus joining her husband in Hel. Hringhorni, Baldr's ship, was the largest of all such vessels and was to serve as the god's funeral ship. No one, however, could seem to launch the boat out to sea.

The gods then enlisted the help of Hyrrokkin, who came from Jötunheimr, arriving on a giant wolf with vipers as reins. When she dismounted, Odin summoned four berserkers to look after the animal but they were unable to control it without first rendering it unconscious. With her seismic strength, the giantess rolled the boat into the water. This caused the earth to quake and the rollers to set on fire, which angered Thor. He was about to kill Hyrrokkin with his hammer Mjöllnir, but the other gods insisted that he spare her.

Guðni Jónsson's edition

En æsirnir tóku lík Baldrs ok fluttu til sævar. Hringhorni hét skip Baldrs. Hann var allra skipa mestr. Hann vildu goðin fram setja ok gera þar á bálför Baldrs, en skipit gekk hvergi fram. Þá var sent í Jötunheima eftir gýgi þeiri, er Hyrrokkin hét. En er hon kom ok reið vargi ok hafði höggorm at taumum, þá hljóp hon af hestinum, en Óðinn kallaði til berserki fjóra at gæta hestsins, ok fengu þeir eigi haldit, nema þeir felldi hann. Þá gekk Hyrrokkin á framstafn nökkvans ok hratt fram í fyrsta viðbragði, svá at eldr hraut ór hlunnunum ok lönd öll skulfu. Þá varð Þórr reiðr ok greip hamarinn ok myndi þá brjóta höfuð hennar, áðr en goðin öll báðu henni friðar.

Translation:
Blackwell's translation

The Æsir then took the dead body and bore it to the seashore, where stood Baldur's ship Hringhorn, which passed for the largest in the world. But when they wanted to launch it in order to make Baldur's funeral pile on it, they were unable to make it stir. In this conjuncture they sent to Jotunheim for a certain giantess named Hyrrokin, who came mounted on a wolf, having twisted serpents for a bridle. As soon as she alighted, Odin ordered four Berserkir to hold her steed fast, who were, however, obliged to throw the animal on the ground ere they could effect their purpose. Hyrrokin then went to the ship, and with a single push set it afloat, but the motion was so violent that the fire sparkled from the rollers, and the earth shook all around. Thor, enraged at the sight, grasped his mallet, and but for the interference of the Æsir would have broken the woman's skull.

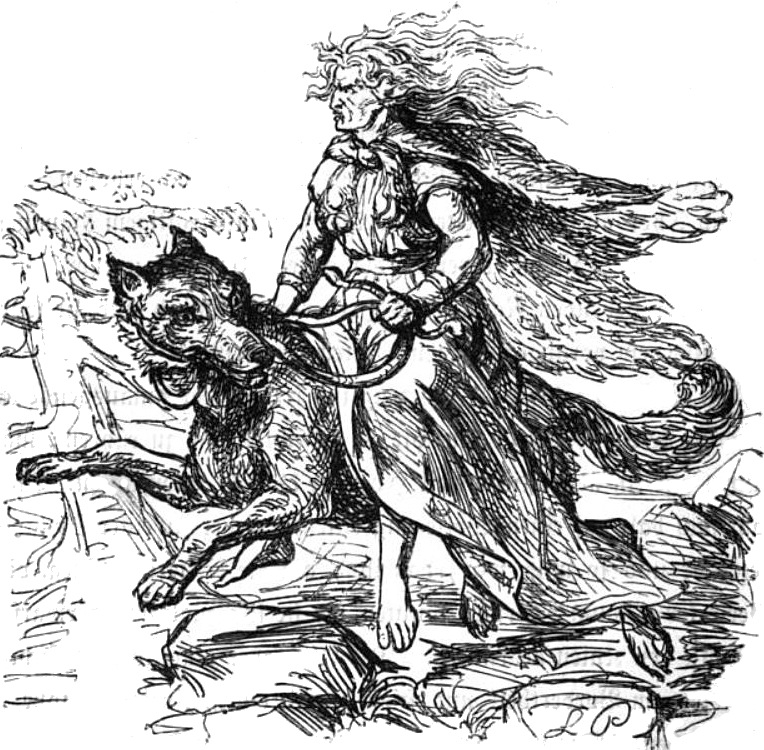
Hyrrokkin by Ludwig Pietsch (1865)

She is also mentioned in a list of troll women by an anonymous skald:

Gjölp, Hyrrokkin,
Hengikepta,
Gneip ok Gnepja,
Geysa, Hála,
Hörn ok Hrúga,
Harðgreip, Forað,
Hryðja, Hveðra
ok Hölgabrúðr.

=== Skaldic poetry ===
The late 10th-century skald Þorbjörn dísarskáld, in two preserved fragments of the Skáldskaparmál (4) addressed directly to Thor, mentions Hyrrokkin among the jötnar killed by the thunder-god at Baldur's funeral:

Ball í Keilu kolli,
Kjallandi brauzt þú alla,
áðr draptu Lút ok Leiða,
léztu dreyra Búseyru;
heftir þú Hengjankjöftu,
Hyrrokkin dó fyrri;
þó var snemr in sáma
Svívör numin lífi.

Guðni Jónsson's edition

Thou didst smite the head of Keila,
Smash Kjallandi altogether,
Ere thou slewest Lútr and Leidi,
Didst spill the blood of Búseyra;
Didst hold back Hengjankjapta,
Hyrrokkin died before;
Yet sooner in like fashion
Svívör from life was taken.

Brodeur's translation (1923)

[Mjöllnir] struck on Keila's skull,
Kjallandi you battered in full;
Lút and Leida you'd already killed,
Búseyra's blood you let flow;
Hengjankjapta you finished off,
Hyrrokkin died at an earlier stage,
and similarly Svívör, earlier still,
was likewise deprived of her life.

Andy Orchard's translation (1997)

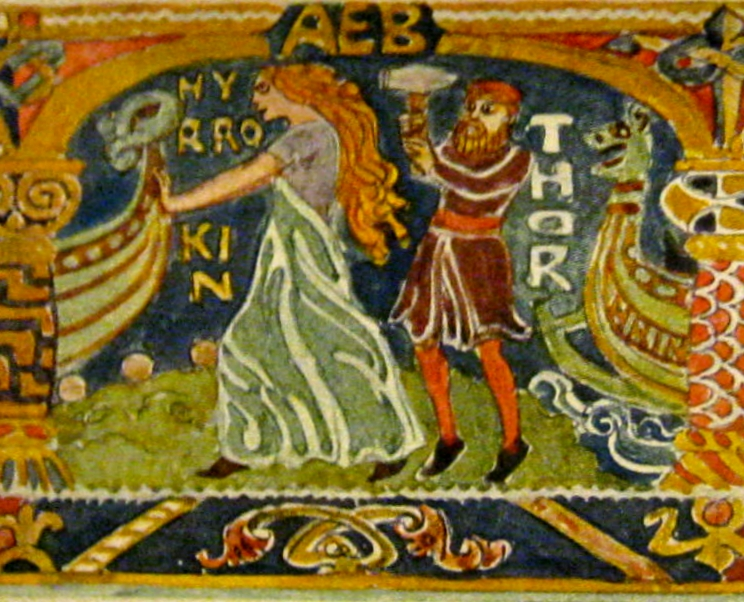
Hyrrokkin pushes the ship, angering Thor. Illustration by Emil Doepler, c. 1905.

The poem Húsdrápa ('House-Lay'), composed by Úlfr Uggason around 985 AD in western Iceland and partially preserved in the Prose Edda, also appears to refer to Hyrrokkin at Baldr's funeral: "The very powerful Hild of the mountains [giantess] (Note: Hild or Hildr in this context is simply a kenning for 'giantess' generally and Hyrrokkin specifically.) caused the sea-Sleipnir [ship] to lumber forward, but the wielders of the helmet flames [warriors] of Hropt [Odin] felled her mount."

== In popular culture ==
Hyrokkin is featured in the 2020 video game, Assassin's Creed Valhalla, during the missions taking place in Jötunheimr. The missions being merely vision interpretations of the fictional precursor race, the Isu's history, an equivalence is made to Juno, who was mentioned in Assassin's Creed II but made her first appearance in Assassin's Creed: Brotherhood.

== See also ==
- Snake-witch stone, a picture stone depicting a female grasping two snakes

== Additional relevant literature ==
- Ásdísardóttir, Ingunn. 2025. “Hyrrokinn – Monster or Mighty Priestess?” Good Thoughts on Folklore and Mythology: Festschrift in Honor of Terry Gunnell, vol. 1.2 Folklore. Budapest: Trivent Publishing.
