= Forseti =

Norse god of peace, truth, and justice

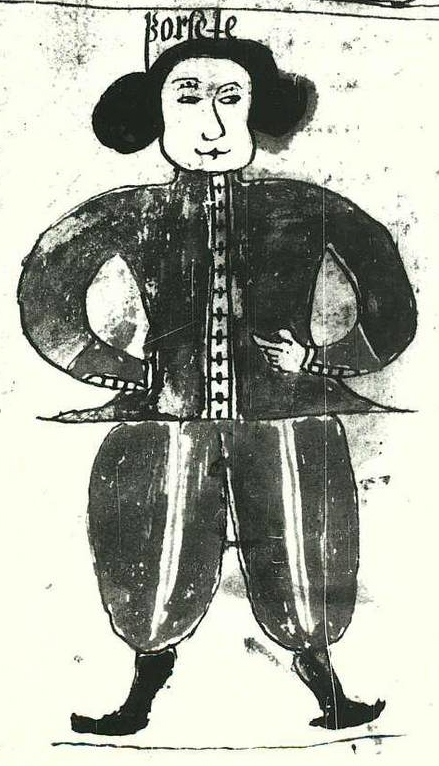
Forseti, 1680

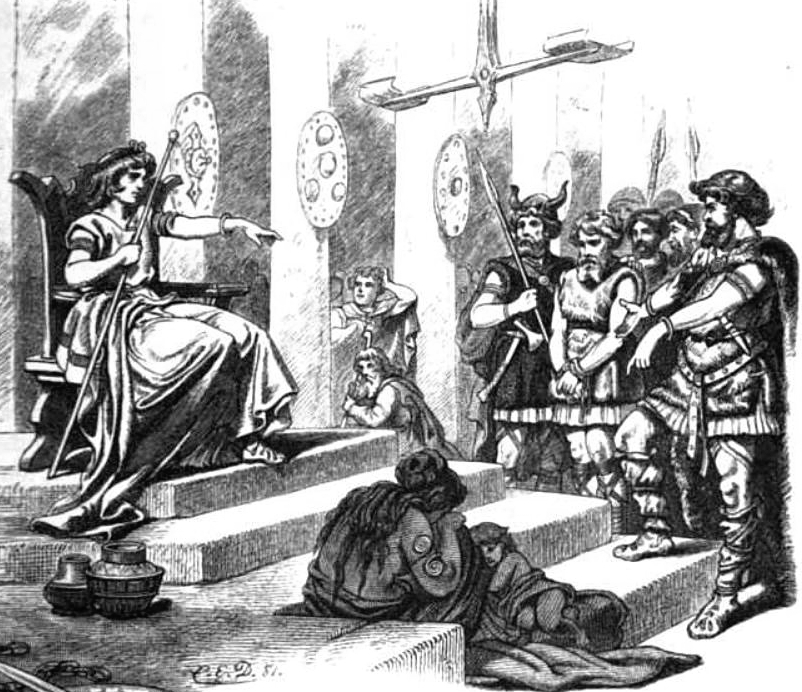
Forseti Seated in Judgment (1881) by Carl Emil Doepler

Forseti (Old Norse for 'the presiding one'; it means 'president' in modern Icelandic and Faroese) is the Norse god of justice and reconciliation. He is generally identified with Fosite, a god of the Frisians.

== Name ==
Grimm took Forseti, "praeses, princeps", to be the older form of the name, first postulating the Old High German equivalent *forasizo (cf. modern German Vorsitzender "one who presides", Old English fore-sittan 'to preside'). but later preferring a derivation from fors, a "whirling stream" or "cataract", connected to the spring and the god's veneration by seagoing peoples. It is plausible that Fosite is the older name and Forseti a folk etymology. According to the German philologist Hans Kuhn the Germanic form Fosite is linguistically identical to Greek Poseidon, hence the original name may have been introduced before the Proto-Germanic sound change, possibly via Greek sailors purchasing amber (cf. Phol as a cognate of Baldr). The etymologist Wolfgang Laur, is highly critical, however, as the names of Germanic gods are composed almost exclusively of Germanic components. According to Laur, the name Forseti remains largely unexplained.

== Old Norse Forseti ==
According to Snorri Sturluson in the Prose Edda, Forseti is the son of Baldr and Nanna. His is the best of courts; all those who come before him leave reconciled. This suggests skill in mediation and is in contrast to his fellow god Týr, who "is not called a reconciler of men." However, as de Vries points out, the only basis for associating Forseti with justice seems to have been his name; there is no corroborating evidence in Norse mythology. 'Puts to sleep all suits' or 'stills all strifes' may have been a late addition to the strophe Snorri cites, from which he derives the information.

The first element in the name Forsetlund (Old Norse Forsetalundr), a farm in the parish of Onsøy ('Odin's island'), in eastern Norway, seems to be the genitive case of Forseti, offering evidence he was worshipped there.

=== Glitnir ===
Glitnir (meaning 'one who shines') is the hall of Forseti, and the seat of justice amongst gods and men. It is also noted to have been a place of dwelling for Baldr, Forseti's father in Norse and Germanic mythologies. Glitnir is symbolic of the importance of discussion rather than violence as a means of resolution of conflict within the Norse tradition. It has pillars of gold and is roofed with silver, which radiated light that could be seen from a great distance. The stories of Baldr and his son Forseti may have been contaminated with legends about king Guðmundr and his son Höfundr ('the judge'), who inhabited the otherworld land of Glæsisvellir.

== Frisian Fosite ==
According to Alcuin's Life of St. Willebrord, the saint visited an island between Frisia and Denmark that was sacred to Fosite and was called Fositesland after the god worshipped there. There was a sacred spring from which water had to be drawn in silence, it was so holy. Willebrord defiled the spring by baptizing people in it and killing a cow there. Altfrid tells the same story of St. Liudger. Adam of Bremen retells the story and adds that the island was Heiligland, i.e., Heligoland.

There is also a late-medieval legend of the origins of written Frisian laws. Wishing to assemble written lawcodes for all his subject peoples, Charlemagne summoned twelve representatives of the Frisian people, the asega's ('law-speakers'), and demanded they recite their people's laws. When they could not do so after several days, he let them choose between death, slavery, or being set adrift in a rudderless boat. They chose the last and prayed for help, whereupon a thirteenth man appeared, with a golden axe on his shoulder. He steered the boat to land with the axe, then threw it ashore; a spring appeared where it landed. He taught them laws and then disappeared. The stranger and the spring have traditionally been identified with Fosite and the sacred spring of Fositesland.

This hypothesis has not met with universal acceptance.

== Reception ==
Jacob Grimm noted that if, as Adam of Bremen states, Fosite's sacred island was Heligoland, that would make him an ideal candidate for a deity known to both Frisians and Scandinavians, but that it is surprising he is never mentioned by Saxo Grammaticus.

== In modern culture ==
The German neofolk band Forseti named itself after the god.

In the 2002 Ensemble Studios game Age of Mythology, Forseti is one of 9 minor gods Norse players can worship.

== See also ==
- Poetic Edda
