= Setre Comb =

Carved bone artifact discovered in Norway

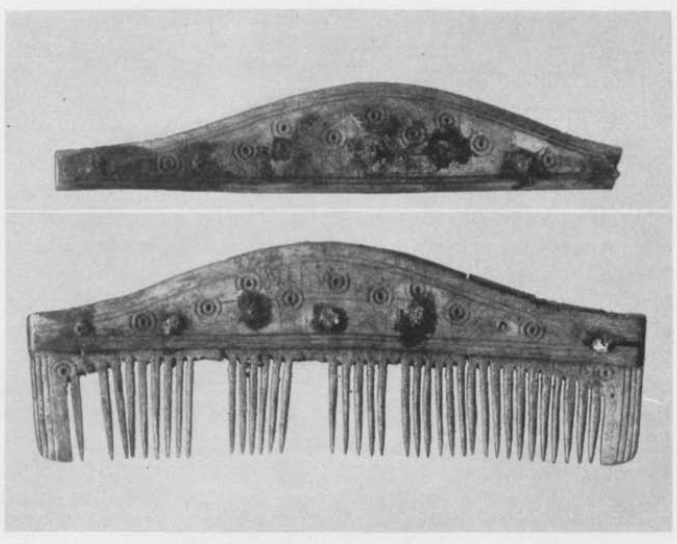
The Setre comb

The Setre Comb is a bone comb found in 1932 at Setre on the island of Bømlo, Norway, which has been dated to between 560 and 700 AD. It has a runic inscription whose interpretation has been extensively discussed.

== Overview ==
The comb, listed as N KJ40 in the Rundata catalog, was discovered in 1932 during archaeological investigation of an ancient refuse heap on the beach at the foot of a cliff in the Sætre (or Setre) fjord on the island of Bømlo, and is now in the collection of the Bergen Museum. Based on the find circumstances in relation to deposition strata, it was dated by Haakon Shetelig and later by Birger Nerman to the second half of the 7th century; Egil Bakka has suggested that the assumption the comb can be dated to when it entered the refuse heap is invalid and it should instead be dated on typological grounds, which might mean it is as early as 575 AD, or possibly 8th-century. Rundata provides a dating to 560/570-600, from 2007.

== Inscription interpretation ==
The inscription features a mixture of Elder Futhark and Younger Futhark runes. There are three rows of text, but it is unclear in what direction it is to be read, or whether all rows are to be read in the same direction. The comb is a subject of study by runologists since most experts agree in reading the Germanic charm word alu and the name Nanna in the inscription, although it is uncertain whether the name refers to the goddess who is known from later attestations.

hᴀl mᴀz ¶ mᴀ unᴀ ¶ ᴀlu na ᴀlu nanᴀ
Hǫll mær {} ma una, {} ǫllu naa, ǫllu nenna.
Leaning maiden may repose, attain everything, be pleased with everything.

However, this ignores the reading of the charm word alu. Several other interpretations have been proposed; no interpretation has been generally accepted.
