= Þorbjörn dísarskáld =

Icelandic medieval poet

Þorbjörn dísarskáld is a late-10th century Icelandic skald (poet). Only one and a half stanzas of his poetry have been preserved in Skáldskaparmál (The Language of Poetry).

== Name ==
Dísarskáld means "poet of the dísir", which implies that he composed verses of the female deities (dísir).

It has also been interpreted as an allusion to a now lost poem about Freyja, whom Snorri Sturluson in Skáldskaparmál calls Vanadís ("lady of the Vanir" or "dís of the Vanir") or one of the dísir.

His name is sometimes anglicized as Thorbjörn dísarskáld or Thorbiorn disarskald.

== Poetry ==
One and a half stanzas are found in Skáldskaparmál as a preserved part of a longer poem about the thunder-god Thor, celebrating his victories on a number of named gýgjar.

[Mjöllnir] struck on Keila’s skull,
Kjallandi you battered in full;
Lút and Leida you’d already killed,
Búseyra’s blood you let flow;
Hengjankjapta you finished off,
Hyrrokkin died at an earlier stage,
and similarly Svívör, earlier still,
was likewise deprived of her life.

— Skáldskaparmál, 4, trans. A. Orchard, 1997.

Another fragment, dealing with the christening of an unknown person, is sometimes attributed to Þorbjörn, although the attribution remains uncertain. According to Anthony Faulkes, if both poems were written by the same author, it could mean that Þorbjörn became Christian.

The Freighter of Wave-Crests' Sea-Wain
Was in the font of christening,
Hoard-Scatterer, who was given
The White Christ's highest favor.

— Skáldskaparmál, 52, trans. A. G. Brodeur, 1916.
