= Baldr =

Norse deity

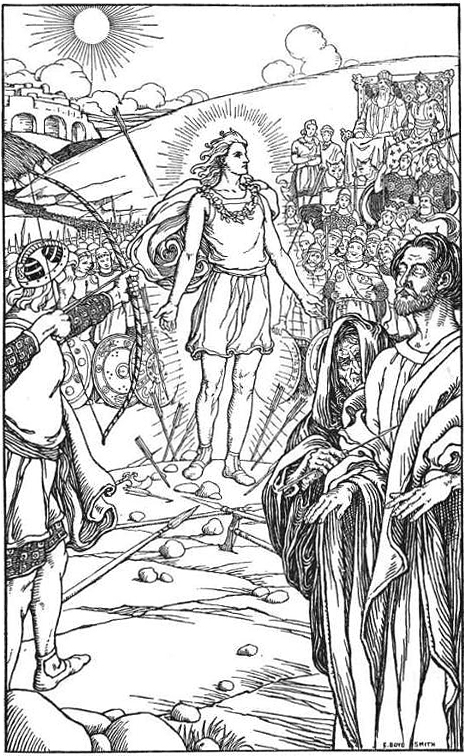
"Each arrow overshot his head" (1902) by Elmer Boyd Smith

Baldr in Old Norse (later Balder in Mainland Nordic, Baldur in Insular Nordic), Bældæġ in Old English, Balder or Palter in Old High German, is a god in Germanic mythology. In Norse mythology, he is a son of the god Odin and the goddess Frigg, and has numerous brothers, such as Thor and Váli.

During the 12th century, Danish accounts by Saxo Grammaticus and other Danish Latin chroniclers recorded a euhemerized account of his story. Compiled in Iceland during the 13th century, but based on older Old Norse poetry, the Poetic Edda and the Prose Edda contain numerous references to the death of Baldr as both a great tragedy to the Æsir and a harbinger of Ragnarök.

According to Gylfaginning, a book of Snorri Sturluson's Prose Edda, Baldr's wife is Nanna and their son is Forseti. Baldr had the greatest ship ever built, Hringhorni, and there is no place more beautiful than his hall, Breidablik.

== Name ==
The Old Norse theonym Baldr (lit. 'bold'; 'brave, defiant'; also 'lord, prince') and its Germanic cognates – Old English Bældæg and Old High German Balder (or Palter) – are generally derived from Proto-Germanic *Balðraz ('Hero, Prince'; cf. Old Norse mann-baldr, 'great man'; Old English bealdor, 'prince, hero'), itself a derivative of *balþaz, meaning 'brave'. (Note: cf. Old Norse ballr, 'hard, stubborn', Gothic balþa*, 'bold, frank'; Old English beald, 'bold, brave, confident'; Old Saxon bald, 'valiant, bold'; Old High German bald, 'brave, courageous'.) Rudolf Simek has noted, however, that this etymology would suggest a warlike or forceful character, a portrayal not clearly supported by the mythological sources.

This etymology was originally proposed by Jacob Grimm (1835), who also suggested a comparison with Lithuanian báltas ('white', also the name of a light-god), positing a semantic development from 'white' to 'shining' then 'strong'. According to linguist Vladimir Orel, this could be linguistically tenable. Early scholars, by deriving the name from the Indo-European root bhel- ('white'), interpreted Baldr as a light-god, in keeping with Snorri's description.

Simek contends that Baeldæg may represent an Old English reflex of the name Baldr, developed from Old English bealdor by analogy with divine names such as Swæfdæg, though it may also be a late Old English development influenced by Scandinavian tradition in the 10th century. He further observes that Baeldæg is replaced by Baldr in one chronicle (Æthelweard), and that Snorri likewise equates the two when he refers to "Beldeg, whom we call Baldr" as the second son of Odin in the prologue to the Edda.

Old Norse also shows the usage of the word as an honorific in a few cases, as in baldur î brynju (Sæm. 272b) and herbaldr (Sæm. 218b), in general epithets of heroes. In continental Saxon and Anglo-Saxon tradition, the son of Woden is called not Bealdor but Baldag (Saxon) and Bældæg, Beldeg (Anglo-Saxon), which shows association with "day", possibly with Day personified as a deity. This, as Grimm points out, would agree with the meaning "shining one, white one, a god" derived from the meaning of Baltic baltas, further adducing Slavic Belobog and German Berhta.

== Attestations ==
=== Merseburg Incantation ===
One of the two Merseburg Incantations names Balder (in the genitive singular Balderes), but also mentions a figure named Phol, considered to be a byname for Baldr (as in Scandinavian Falr, Fjalarr; (in Saxo) Balderus : Fjallerus). The incantation relates of Phol ende Wotan riding to the woods, where the foot of Baldr's foal is sprained. Sinthgunt (the sister of the sun), Frigg and Odin sing to the foot in order for it to heal. The identification with Balder is not conclusive. Modern scholarship suggests that the god Freyr might be meant.

=== Poetic Edda ===
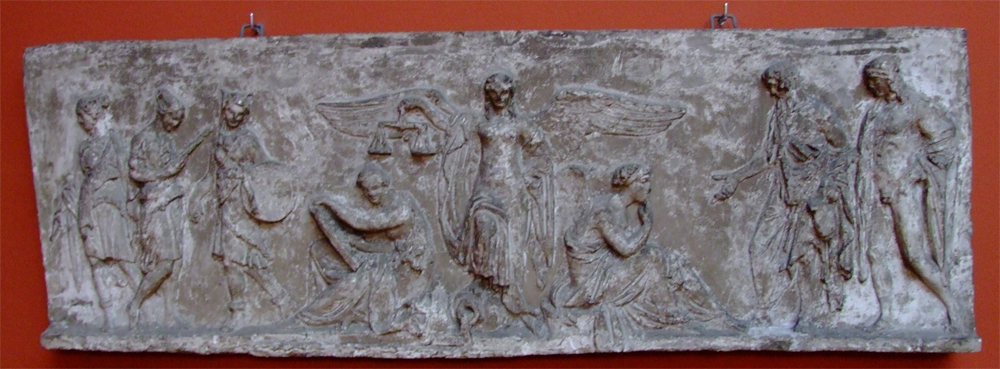
"Mímir and Baldr Consulting the Norns" (1821–1822) by H. E. Freund

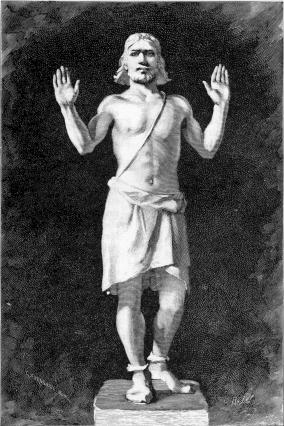
Baldr in an illustration to a Swedish translation of the Elder Edda

Unlike the Prose Edda, in the Poetic Edda the tale of Baldr's death is referred to rather than recounted at length. Baldr is mentioned in Völuspá, in Lokasenna, and is the subject of the Eddic poem Baldr's Dreams.

Among the visions which the Völva sees and describes in Völuspá is Baldr's death. In stanza 32, the Völva says she saw the fate of Baldr "the bleeding god":

Henry Adams Bellows translation:
I saw for Baldr, | the bleeding god,
The son of Othin, | his destiny set:
Famous and fair | in the lofty fields,
Full grown in strength | the mistletoe stood.

In the next two stanzas, the Völva refers to Baldr's killing, describes the birth of Váli for the slaying of Höðr and the weeping of Frigg:

Stanza 33:
From the branch which seemed | so slender and fair
Came a harmful shaft | that Hoth should hurl;
But the brother of Baldr | was born ere long,
And one night old | fought Othin's son.

Stanza 34:
His hands he washed not, | his hair he combed not,
Till he bore to the bale-blaze | Baldr's foe.
But in Fensalir | did Frigg weep sore
For Valhall's need: | would you know yet more?

In stanza 62 of Völuspá, looking far into the future, the Völva says that Höðr and Baldr will come back, with the union, according to Bellows, being a symbol of the new age of peace:

Then fields unsowed | bear ripened fruit,
All ills grow better, | and Baldr comes back;
Baldr and Hoth dwell | in Hropt's battle-hall,
And the mighty gods: | would you know yet more?

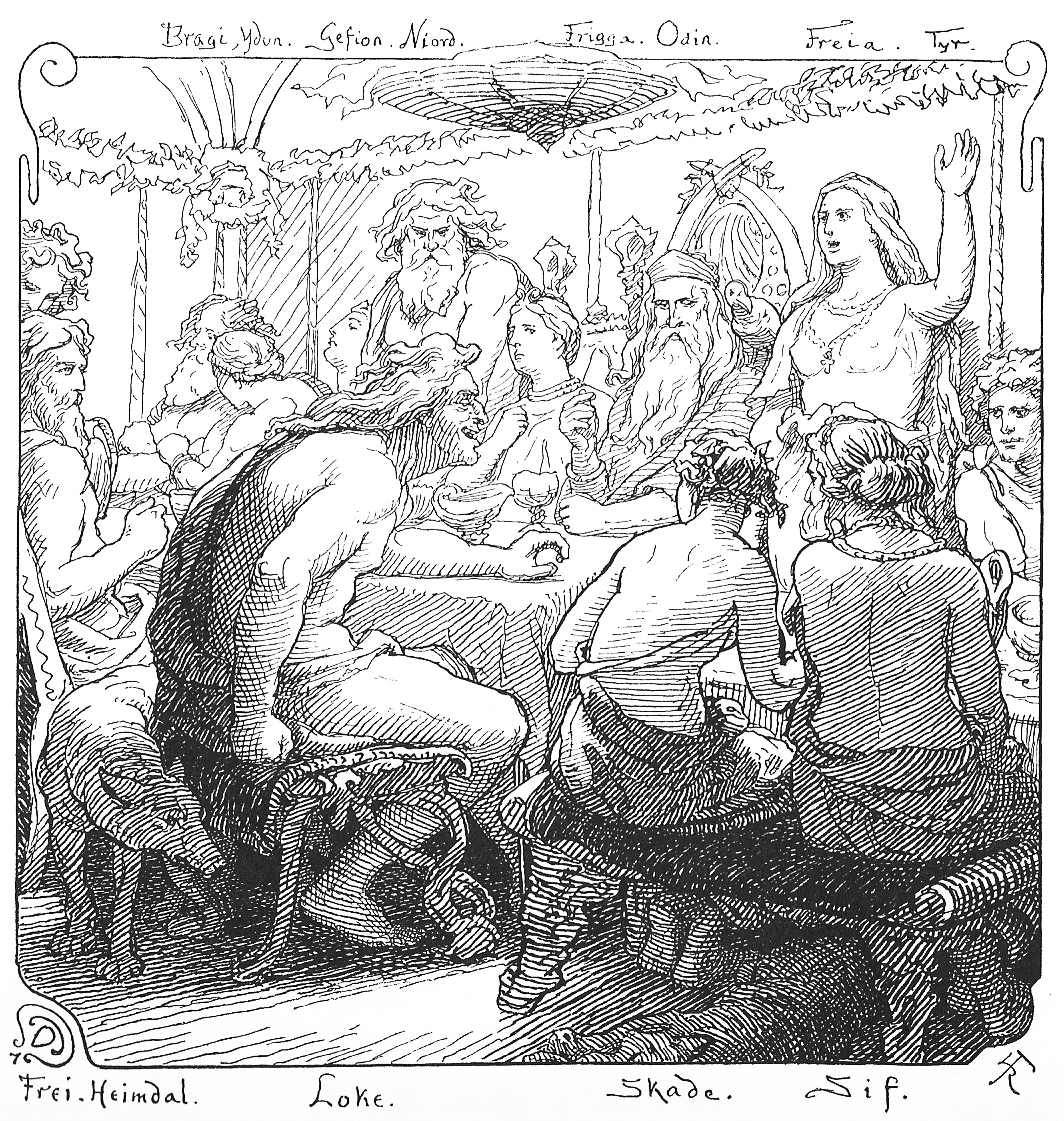
A depiction of Loki quarreling with the gods (1895) by Lorenz Frølich

Baldr is mentioned in two stanzas of Lokasenna, a poem which describes a flyting between the gods and the god Loki. In the first of the two stanzas, Frigg, Baldr's mother, tells Loki that if she had a son like Baldr, Loki would be killed:

Jackson Crawford translation:
You know, if I had a son
like Balder, sitting here
with me in Aegir's hall,
in the presence of these gods,
I declare you would never come out
alive, you'd be killed shortly.

In the next stanza, Loki responds to Frigg, and says that he is the reason Baldr "will never ride home again":

You must want me
to recount even more
of my mischief, Frigg.
After all, I'm the one
who made it so that Balder
will never ride home again.

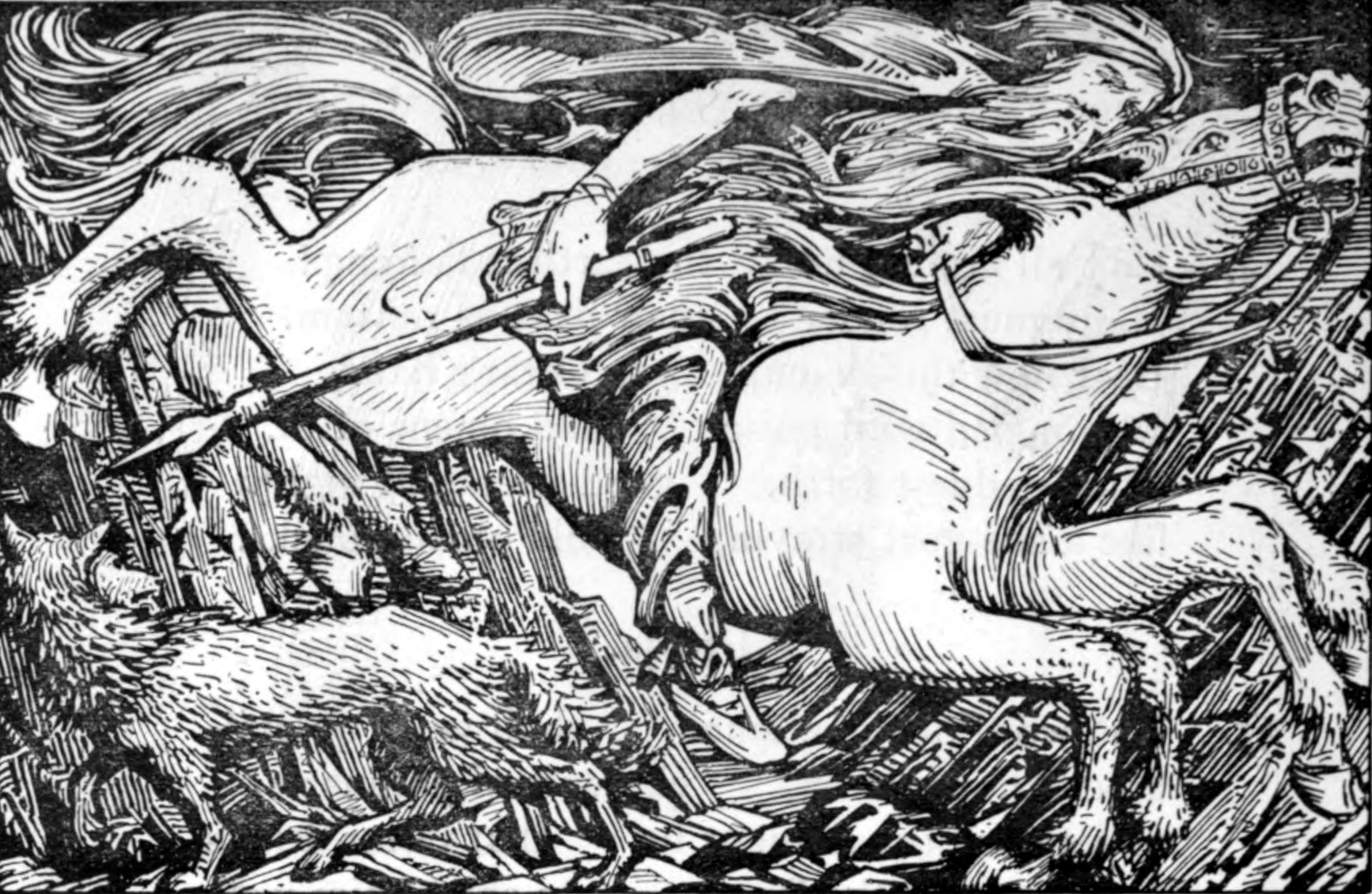
"Odin rides to Hel" (1908) by W. G. Collingwood

The Eddic poem Baldr's Dreams opens with the gods holding a council discussing why Baldr had had bad dreams:

Henry Adams Bellows translation:
Once were the gods | together met,
And the goddesses came | and council held,
And the far-famed ones | the truth would find,
Why baleful dreams | to Baldr had come.

Odin then rides to Hel to a Völva's grave and awakens her using magic. The Völva asks Odin, who she does not recognize, who he is, and Odin answers that he is Vegtam ("Wanderer"). Odin asks the Völva for whom are the benches covered in rings and the floor covered in gold. The Völva tells him that in their location mead is brewed for Baldr, and that she spoke unwillingly, so she will speak no more:

Here for Baldr | the mead is brewed,
The shining drink, | and a shield lies o'er it;
But their hope is gone | from the mighty gods.
Unwilling I spake, | and now would be still.

Odin asks the Völva to not be silent and asks her who will kill Baldr. The Völva replies and says that Höðr will kill Baldr, and again says that she spoke unwillingly, and that she will speak no more:

Hoth thither bears | the far-famed branch,
He shall the bane | of Baldr become,
And steal the life | from Othin's son.
Unwilling I spake, | and now would be still.

Odin again asks the Völva to not be silent and asks her who will avenge Baldr's death. The Völva replies that Váli will, when he will be one night old. Once again, she says that she will speak no more:

Rind bears Vali | in Vestrsalir,
And one night old | fights Othin's son;
His hands he shall wash not, | his hair he shall comb not,
Till the slayer of Baldr | he brings to the flames.
Unwilling I spake, | and now would be still.

Odin again asks the Völva to not be silent and says that he seeks to know who the women that will then weep be. The Völva realizes that Vegtam is Odin in disguise. Odin says that the Völva is not a Völva, and that she is the mother of three giants. The Völva tells Odin to ride back home proud, because she will speak to no more men until Loki escapes his bounds.

=== Prose Edda ===
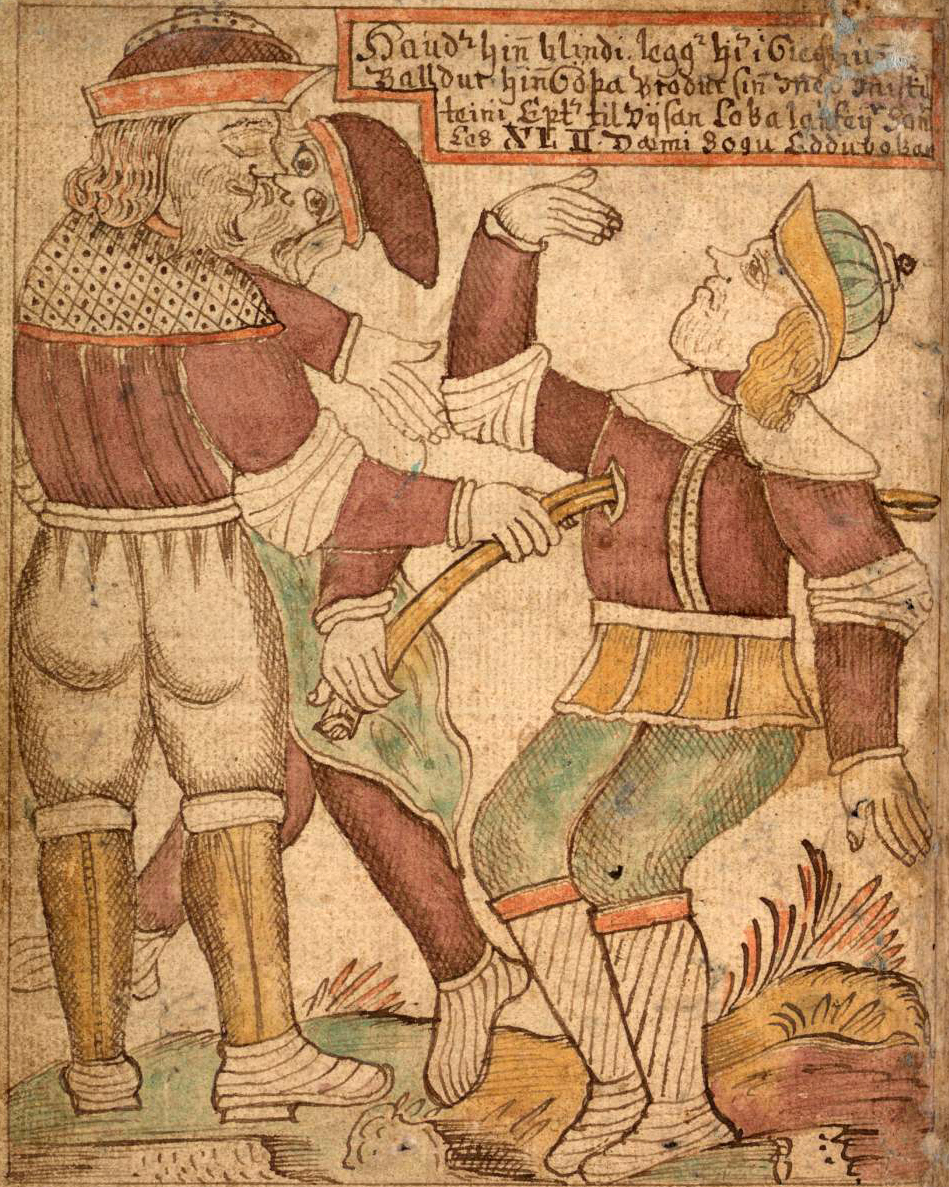
Baldr's death is portrayed in this illustration from an 18th-century Icelandic manuscript.

In Gylfaginning, Baldr is described as follows:

Annarr sonr Óðins er Baldr, ok er frá honum gott at segja. Hann er beztr, ok hann lofa allir. Hann er svá fagr álitum ok bjartr, svá at lýsir af honum, ok eitt gras er svá hvítt, at jafnat er til Baldrs brár. Þat er allra grasa hvítast, ok þar eftir máttu marka fegurð hans bæði á hár ok á líki. Hann er vitrastr ásanna ok fegrst talaðr ok líknsamastr, en sú náttúra fylgir honum, at engi má haldast dómr hans. Hann býr þar, sem heitir Breiðablik. Þat er á himni. Í þeim stað má ekki vera óhreint[.]

Translation:

The second son of Odin is Baldr, and good things are to be said of him. He is best, and all praise him; he is so fair of feature, and so bright, that light shines from him. A certain herb is so white that it is likened to Baldr's brow; of all grasses it is whitest, and by it thou mayest judge his fairness, both in hair and in body. He is the wisest of the Æsir, and the fairest-spoken and most gracious; and that quality attends him, that none may gainsay his judgments. He dwells in the place called Breidablik, which is in heaven; in that place may nothing unclean be[.]

— Brodeur's translation

Apart from this description, Baldr is known primarily for the story of his death, which is seen as the first in a chain of events that will ultimately lead to the destruction of the gods at Ragnarök.

Baldr had a dream of his own death and his mother, Frigg, had the same dream. Since dreams were usually prophetic, this depressed him, and so Frigg made every object on earth vow never to hurt Baldr. All objects made this vow, save for the mistletoe—a detail which has traditionally been explained with the idea that it was too unimportant and nonthreatening to bother asking it to make the vow, but which Merrill Kaplan has instead argued echoes the fact that young people were not eligible to swear legal oaths, which could make them a threat later in life.

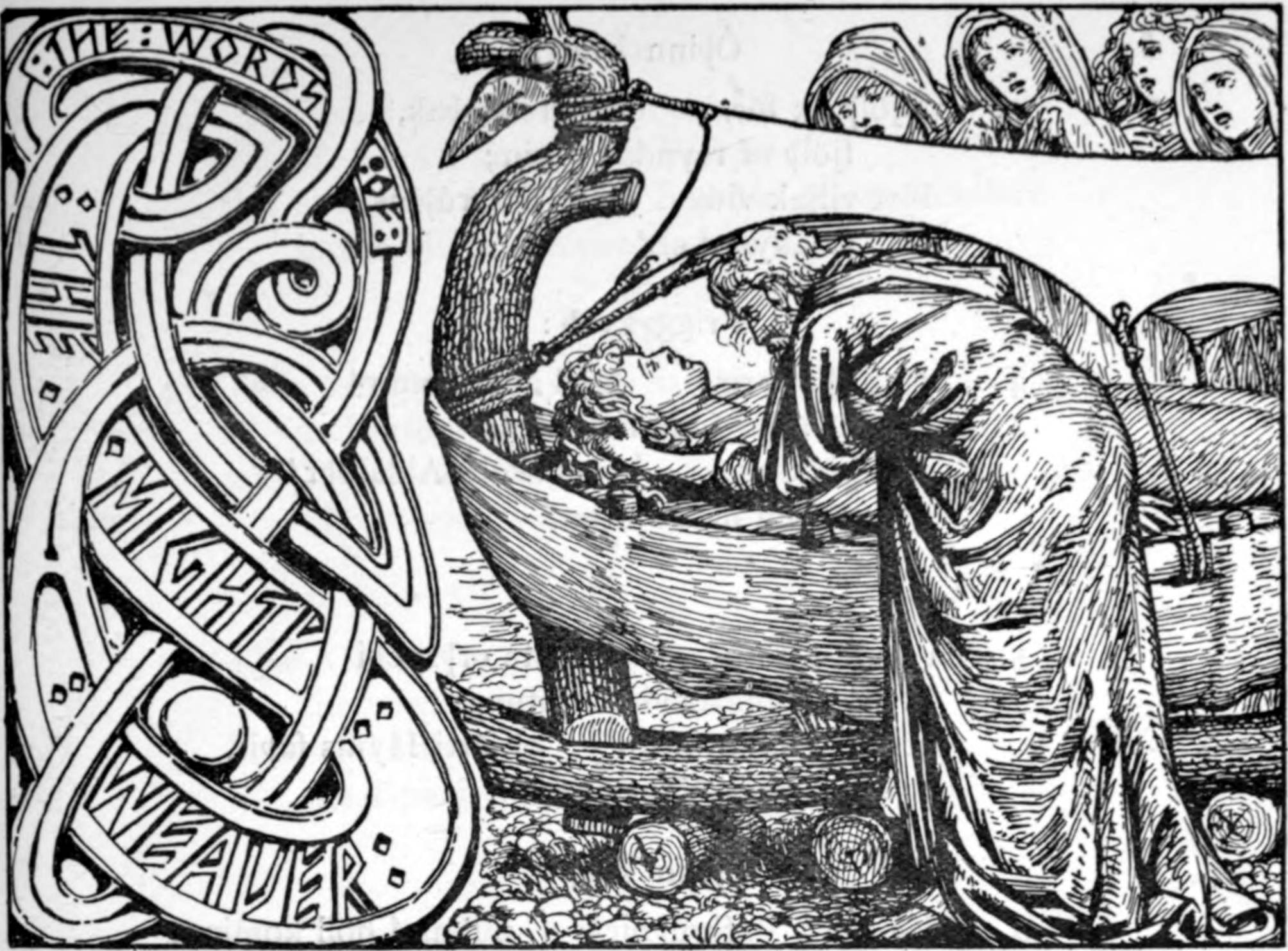
Odin's last words to Baldr (1908) by W. G. Collingwood

When Loki, the mischief-maker, heard of this, he made a magical spear from this plant (in some later versions, an arrow). He hurried to the place where the gods were indulging in their new pastime of hurling objects at Baldr, which would bounce off without harming him. Loki gave the spear to Baldr's brother, the blind god Höðr, who then inadvertently killed his brother with it (other versions suggest that Loki guided the arrow himself). For this act, Odin and the ásynja Rindr gave birth to Váli, who grew to adulthood within a day and slew Höðr.

Baldr was ceremonially burnt upon his ship Hringhorni, the largest of all ships. On the pyre he was given the magical ring Draupnir. At first the gods were not able to push the ship out onto sea, and so they sent for Hyrrokin, a giantess, who came riding on a wolf and gave the ship such a push that fire flashed from the rollers and all the earth shook.

As he was carried to the ship, Odin whispered something in his ear. The import of this speech was held to be unknowable, and the question of what was said was thus used as an unanswerable riddle by Odin in other sources, namely against the giant Vafthrudnir in the Eddic poem Vafthrudnismal and in the riddles of Gestumblindi in Hervarar saga.

Upon seeing the corpse being carried to the ship, Nanna, his wife, died of grief. She was then placed on the funeral fire (perhaps a toned-down instance of Sati, also attested in the Arab traveller Ibn Fadlan's account of a funeral among the Rus'), after which it was set on fire. Baldr's horse with all its trappings was also laid on the pyre.

As the pyre was set on fire, Thor blessed it with his hammer Mjǫllnir. As he did a small dwarf named Litr came running before his feet. Thor then kicked him into the pyre.

Upon Frigg's entreaties, delivered through the messenger Hermod, Hel promised to release Baldr from the underworld if all objects alive and dead would weep for him. All did, except a giantess, Þökk (often presumed to be the god Loki in disguise), who refused to mourn the slain god. Thus Baldr had to remain in the underworld, not to emerge until after Ragnarök, when he and his brother Höðr would be reconciled and rule the new earth together with Thor's sons.

Besides these descriptions of Baldr, the Prose Edda also explicitly links him to the Anglo-Saxon Beldeg in its prologue.

=== Gesta Danorum ===
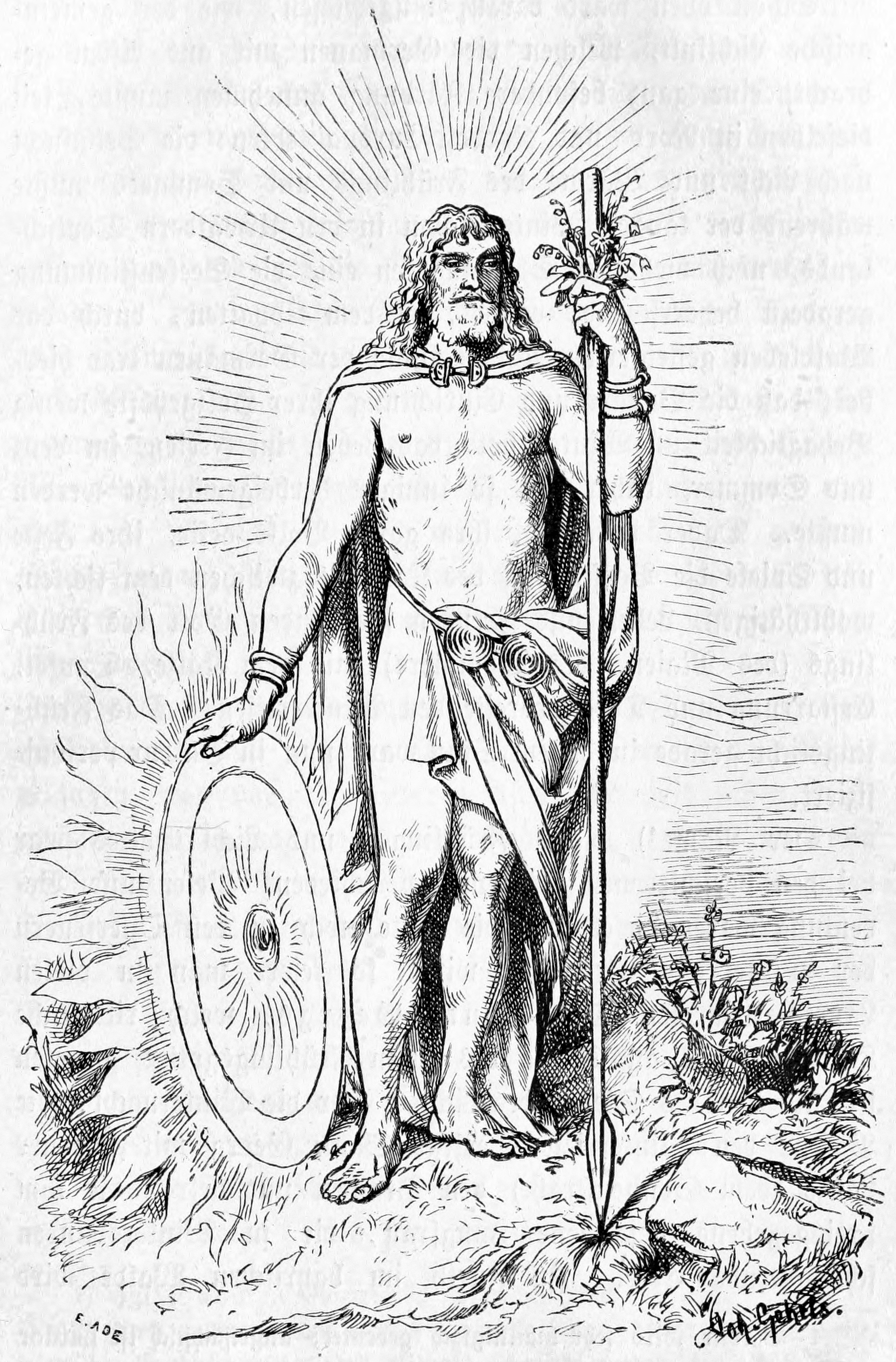
Baldur by Johannes Gehrts

Writing during the end of the 12th century, the Danish historian Saxo Grammaticus tells the story of Baldr (recorded as Balderus) in a form that professes to be historical. According to him, Balderus and Høtherus were rival suitors for the hand of Nanna, daughter of Gewar, King of Norway. Balderus was a demigod and common steel could not wound his sacred body. The two rivals encountered each other in a terrific battle. Though Odin and Thor and the other gods fought for Balderus, he was defeated and fled away, and Høtherus married the princess.

Nevertheless, Balderus took heart of grace and again met Høtherus in a stricken field. But he fared even worse than before. Høtherus dealt him a deadly wound with a magic sword which he had received from Mimir, the satyr of the woods; after lingering three days in pain Balderus died of his injury and was buried with royal honours in a barrow.

=== Utrecht Inscription ===
A Latin votive inscription from Utrecht, from the 3rd or 4th century C.E., has been theorized as containing the dative form Baldruo, pointing to a Latin nominative singular *Baldruus, which some have identified with the Norse/Germanic god, although both the reading and this interpretation have been questioned.

=== Anglo-Saxon Chronicle ===
In the Anglo-Saxon Chronicle Baldr is named as the ancestor of the monarchy of Kent, Bernicia, Deira, and Wessex through his supposed son Brond.

=== Toponyms ===
There are a few old place names in Scandinavia that contain the name Baldr. The most certain and notable one is the (former) parish name Balleshol in Hedmark county, Norway: "a Balldrshole" 1356 (where the last element is hóll m "mound; small hill"). Others may be (in Norse forms) Baldrsberg in Vestfold county, Baldrsheimr in Hordaland county Baldrsnes in Sør-Trøndelag county—and (very uncertain) the Balsfjorden fjord and Balsfjord Municipality in Troms county.

In Copenhagen, there is also a Baldersgade, or "Balder's Street". A street in downtown Reykjavík is called Baldursgata (Baldur's Street).

In Sweden there is a Baldersgatan (Balder's Street) in Stockholm. There is also Baldersnäs (Balder's isthmus), Baldersvik (Balder's bay), Balders udde (Balder's headland) and Baldersberg (Balder's mountain) at various places.

== See also ==
- List of Germanic deities
- Lemminkäinen
