= Snake-witch stone =

Picture stone from Gotland, Sweden

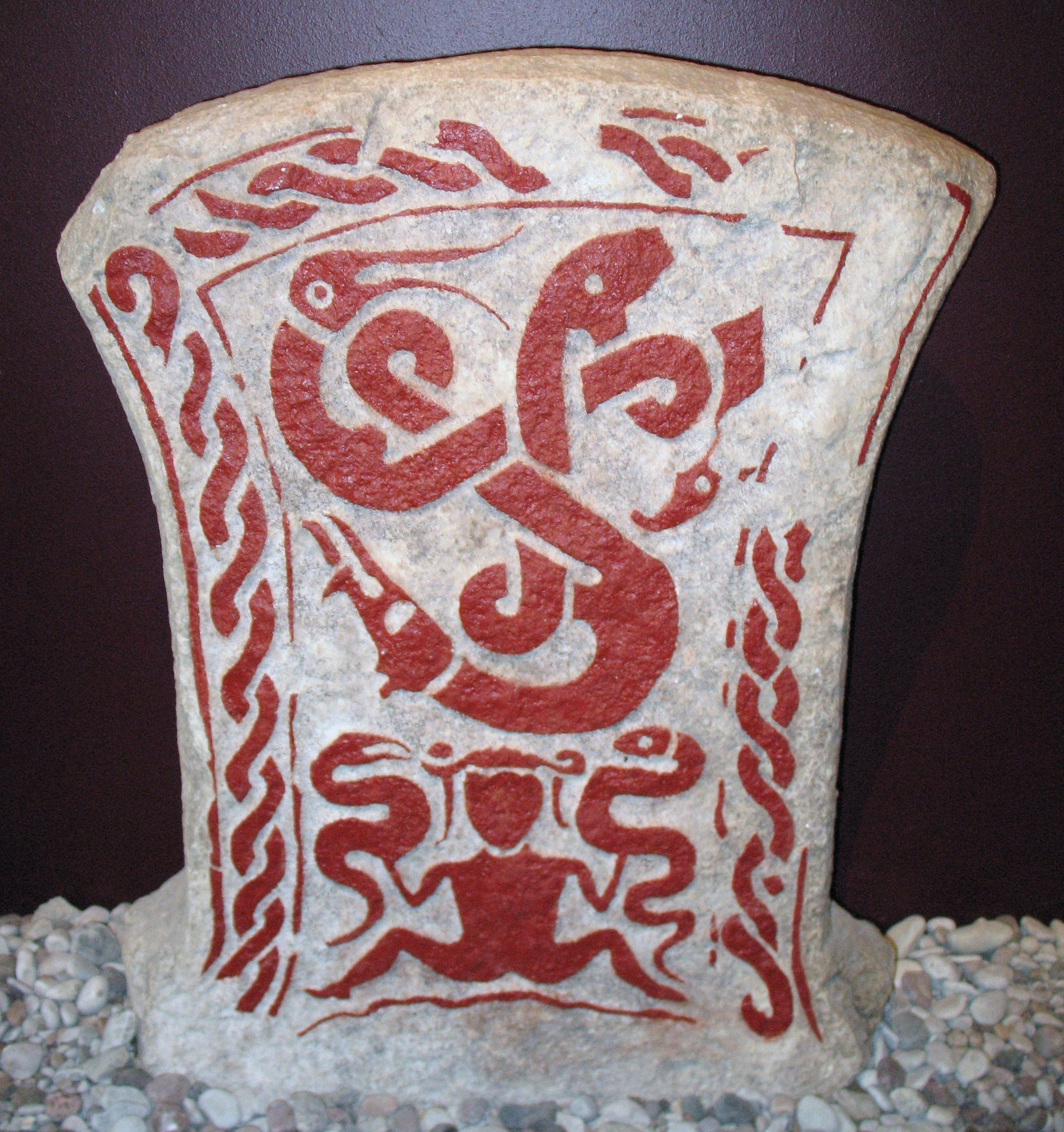
The snake-witch stone

The Snake-witch (Swedish: Ormhäxan), Snake-charmer (Swedish: Ormtjuserskan) or Smiss stone (Swedish: Smisstenen) is a picture stone found at Smiss, När socken, Gotland, Sweden.

== History ==
Discovered in a cemetery, it measures 82 cm (32 in) in height and depicts a figure holding a snake in each hand. Above the figure there are three interlaced creatures (forming a triskelion pattern) that have been identified as a boar, an eagle, and a wolf. The stone has been dated to 400–600 AD. The scholars call it the "Snake-witch".

== Parallels, interpretations, and speculation ==
The figure on the stone was first described by Sune Lindquist in 1955. He tried unsuccessfully to find connections with accounts in Old Icelandic sources, and he also compared the stone with the Snake Goddess from Crete. Lindquist found connections with the late Celtic Gundestrup cauldron, although he appears to have overlooked that the cauldron also shows a figure holding a snake.

Arrhenius and Holmquist (1960) also found a connection with late Celtic art suggesting that the stone depicted Daniel in the lions' den and compared it with a depiction on a purse lid from Sutton Hoo, although the stone in question does not show creatures with legs. Arwidsson (1963) also attributed the stone to late Celtic art and compared it with the figure holding a snake on the Gundestrup cauldron. In a later publication Arrhenius (1994) considered the figure not to be a witch but a magician and she dated it to the Vendel Period, although men are called witches also, and the legs spread clearly identifies this as a female, making her a witch who was a magician. Hauk (1983), who is a specialist on bracteates, suggested that the stone depicts Odin in the fetch of a woman, while Görman (1983) has proposed that the stone depicts the Celtic god Cernunnos.

It also has been connected to a nearby stone relief on a doorjamb at Väte Church on Gotland which shows a woman who suckles two dragons, but this was made five centuries later than the picture stone.

The stone has also been interpreted as depicting Vitastjärna from the Gutasaga, who dreamt of three entwined snakes symbolizing her future sons, the ancestors of the Gotlanders. This interpretation draws from the saga's account of Vitastjärna's dream, where three snakes intertwined around her, foretelling the birth of her sons who would populate Gotland.

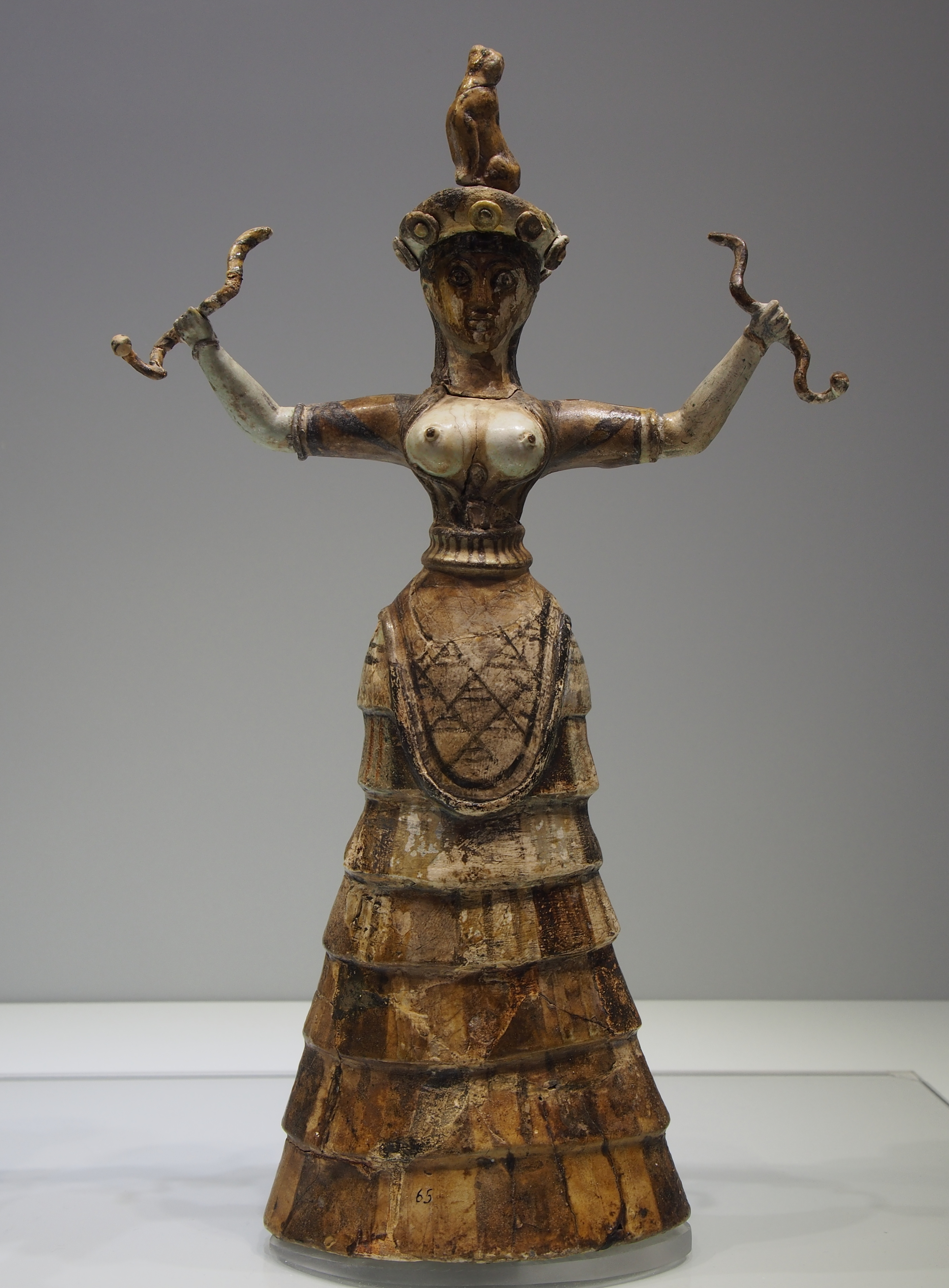
The Snake Goddess from Crete c. 1600 BCE

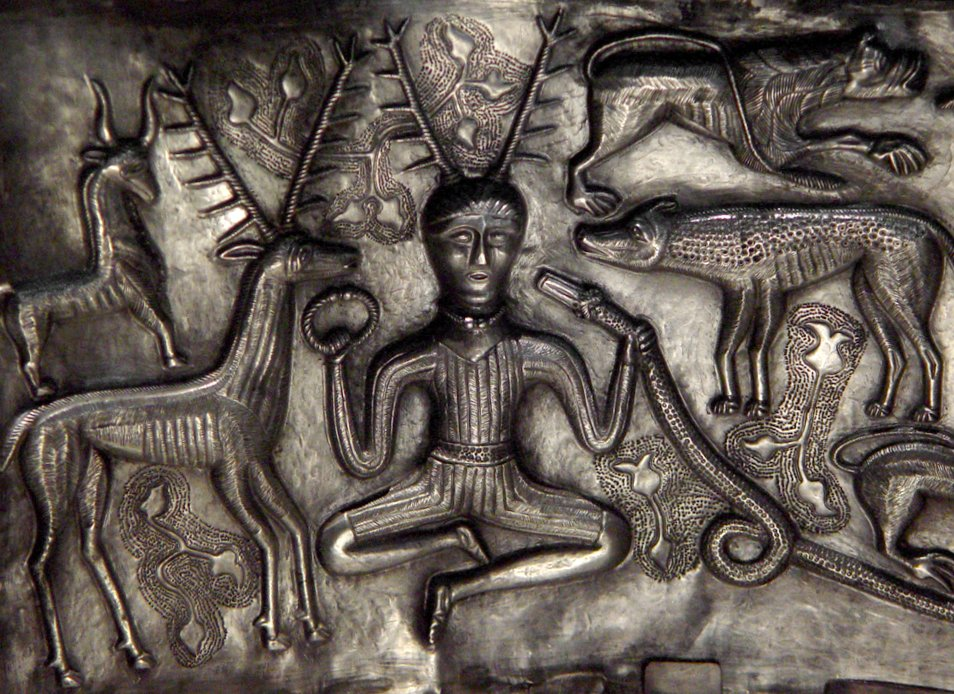
The antlered figure on the Gundestrup cauldron c. 1 to 2 BCE found in Denmark

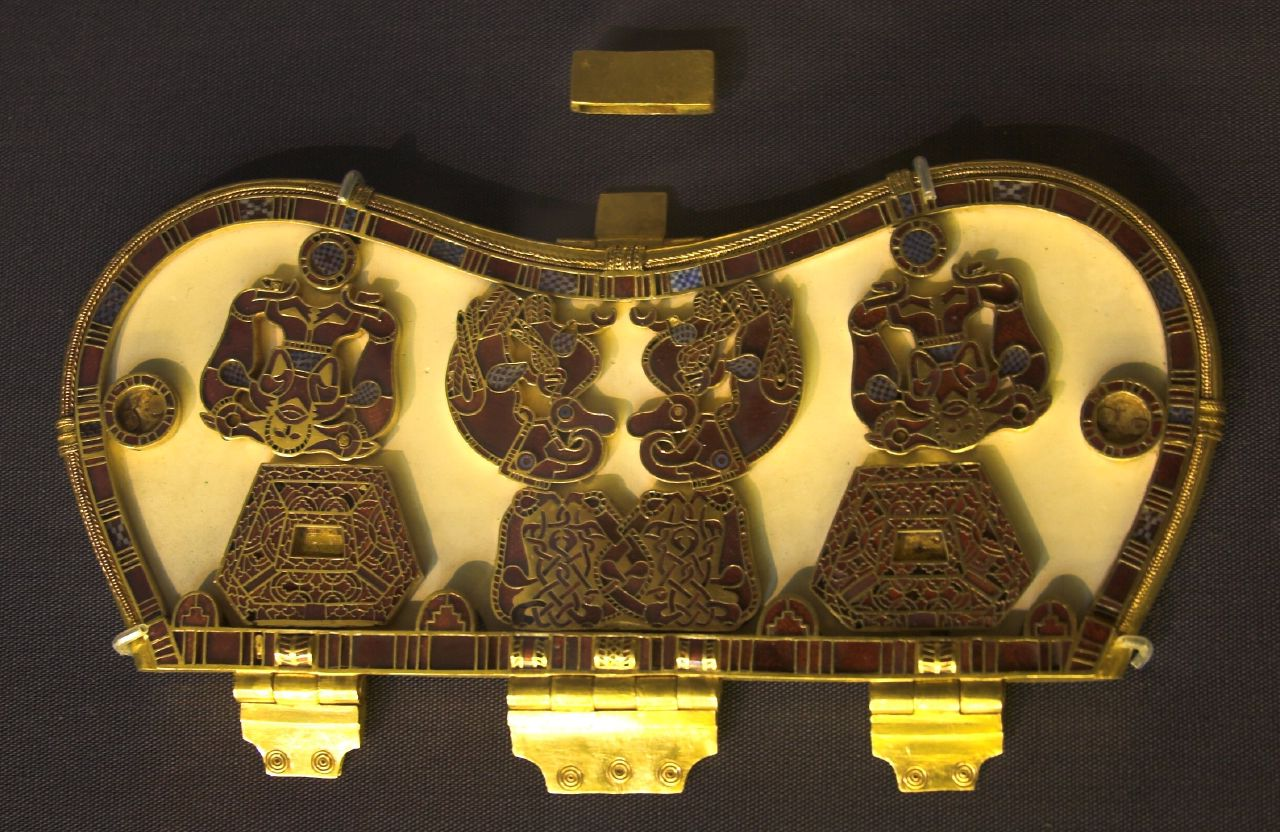
The purse lid c. 6th to 7th century Sutton Hoo burial site, England. British Museum.

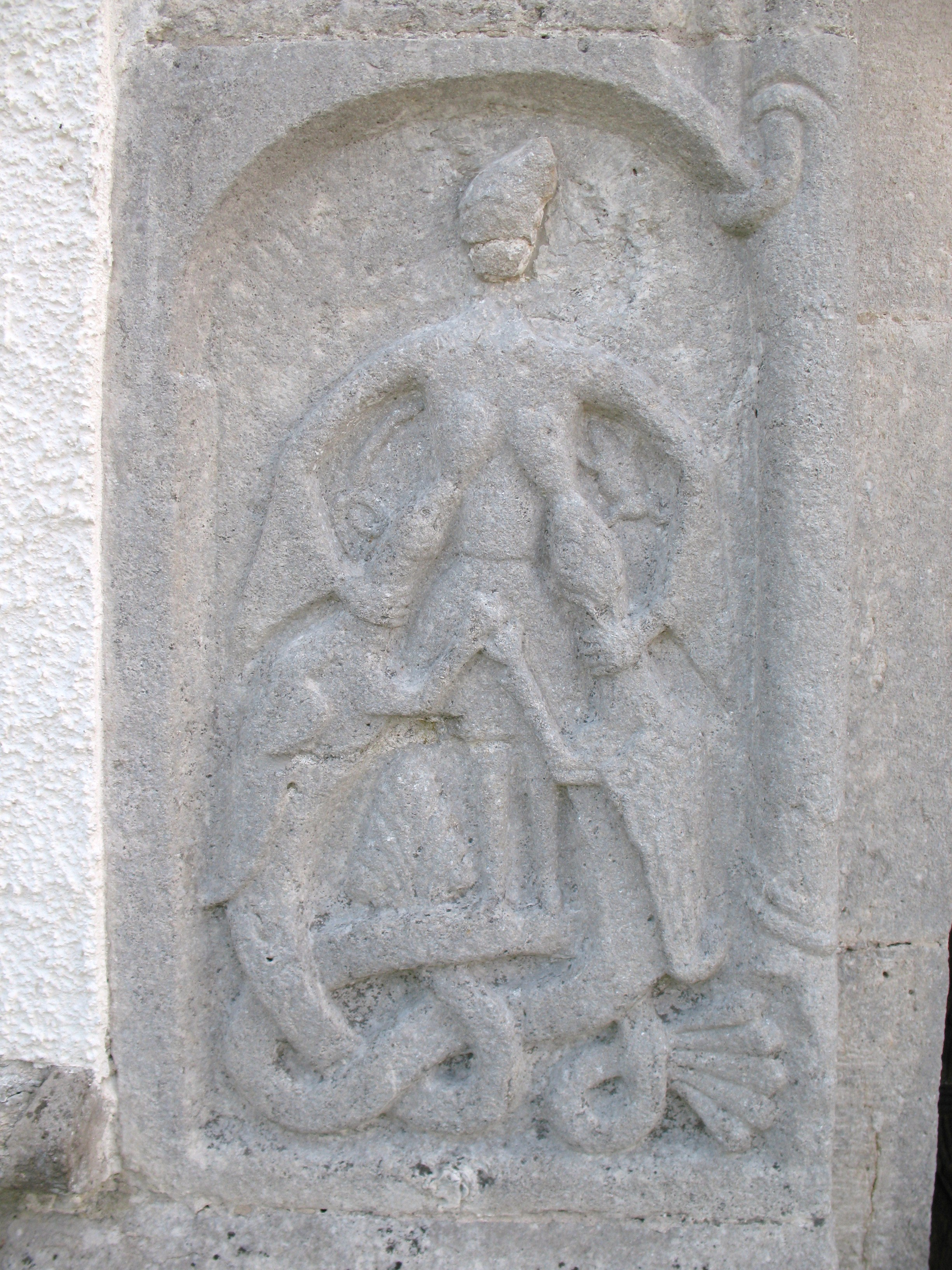
The relief at Väte of a woman suckling dragons

== Snake symbolism ==
Snakes were popular as a motif on later picture stones which show snake pits, used as a painful means of execution; this form of punishment also is known through Norse sagas. Snakes are considered to have had an important symbolism during the passage from paganism to Germanic Christianity. They were frequently combined with images of deer, crustaceans, or supernatural beasts. The purpose may have been to protect the stones and to deter people who might destroy them.

== See also ==
- Hyrrokkin, a giantess in Norse mythology who uses snakes as reins
