= Hringhorni =

Ship in Norse mythology

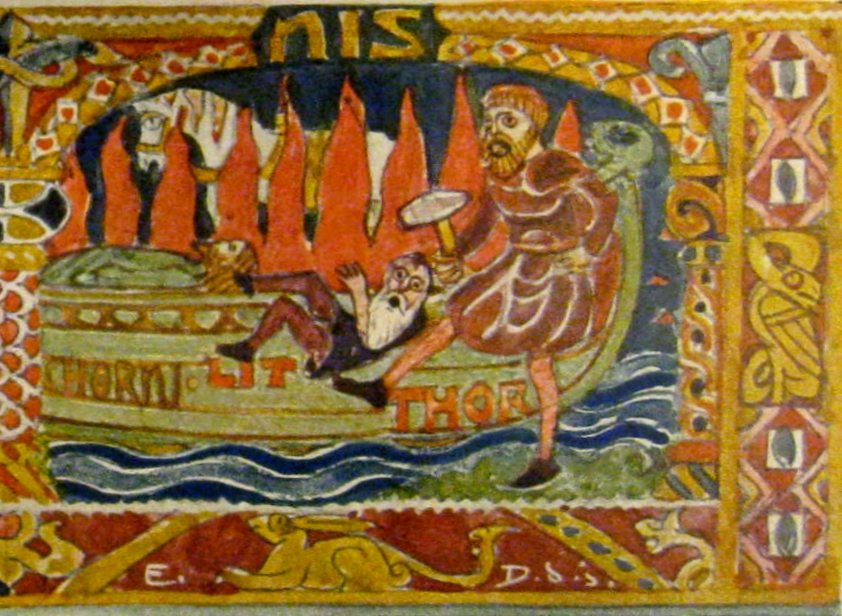
Thor Kicks Litr onto Baldr's Burning Ship, illustration by Emil Doepler (ca. 1905).

In Norse mythology, Hringhorni (Old Norse "ship with a circle on the stem") is the name of the ship of the god Baldr, described as the "greatest of all ships".

== Mythology ==
According to Gylfaginning, following the murder of Baldr by Loki, the other gods brought his body down to the sea and laid him to rest on the ship. They would have launched it out into the water and kindled a funeral pyre for Baldr but were unable to move the great vessel without the help of the giantess Hyrrokkin, who was sent for out of Jötunheim. She then flung the ship so violently down the rollers at the first push that flames appeared and the earth trembled, much to the annoyance of Thor.

Along with Baldr, his wife Nanna was also borne to the funeral pyre after she had died of grief. As Thor was consecrating the fire with his hammer Mjolnir, a dwarf named Litr began cavorting at his feet. Thor then kicked him into the flames and the dwarf was burned up as well. The significance of this seemingly incidental event is speculative but may perhaps find a parallel in religious ritual. Among other artifacts and creatures sacrificed on the pyre of Hringhorni were Odin's gold ring Draupnir and the horse of Baldr with all its trappings.
