= Mama and papa =

In linguistics, a commonly seen sequence of sounds meaning "mother" and "father"

In linguistics, mama and papa are considered a special case of false cognates. In many languages of the world, sequences of sounds similar to /mama/ and /papa/ mean "mother" and "father", usually but not always in that order. This is thought to be a coincidence resulting from the process of early language acquisition.

== Etymology ==
Mama and papa use speech sounds that are among the easiest to produce: bilabial consonants like /m/, /p/, and /b/, and the open vowel /a/. They are, therefore, often among the first word-like sounds made by babbling babies (babble words), and parents tend to associate the first sound babies make with themselves and to employ them subsequently as part of their baby-talk lexicon. Thus, there is no need to ascribe to common ancestry the similarities of !Kung ba, Aramaic abba, Mandarin Chinese bàba, Yoruba bàbá, and Persian baba (all 'father'); or Navajo amá, Mandarin Chinese māma, Swahili mama, Quechua mama, and Polish mama (all 'mother').

Linguist Roman Jakobson hypothesized that the nasal sound in "mama" comes from the nasal murmur that babies produce when breastfeeding:

Often the sucking activities of a child are accompanied by a slight nasal murmur, the only phonation which can be produced when the lips are pressed to mother’s breast or to the feeding bottle and the mouth full. Later, this phonatory reaction to nursing is reproduced as an anticipatory signal at the mere sight of food and finally as a manifestation of a desire to eat, or more generally, as an expression of discontent and impatient longing for missing food or absent nurser, and any ungranted wish. When the mouth is free from nutrition, the nasal murmur may be supplied with an oral, particularly labial release; it may also obtain an optional vocalic support.

— Roman Jakobson, Why 'Mama' and 'Papa'?

The baby, with no particular thought, is babbling his "mamma, mamma", and the adults are interpreting it their own way. Some imagine he calls "mother", others believe he addresses his father, and yet others thinks he calls no one, but is simply hungry, wants to eat. They are all equally correct, and are all just as equally mistaken.

— Lev Uspensky, The Word About Words (1954)

=== Variants ===
Variants using other sounds do occur: for example, in Fijian, the word for "mother" is nana, in Turkish, the word for mother is ana, and in Old Japanese, the word for "mother" was papa. The modern Japanese word for "father", chichi, is from older titi (but papa is more common colloquially in modern Japanese). Very few languages lack labial consonants (this mostly being attested on a family basis, in the Iroquoian and some of the Athabaskan languages), and only Arapaho is known to lack an open vowel /a/. The Tagalog -na- / -ta- ("mom" / "dad" words) parallel the more common ma / pa in nasality / orality of the consonants and identity of place of articulation.

== Examples by language family ==
"Mama" and "papa" in different languages:

=== Afro-Asiatic languages ===
- Aramaic: Imma for mother and Abba for father
- Hebrew: Imma for mother and Abba for father
- Arabic: أم (umm) for mother and أب (ab) for father (formal). When actually talking to them, they are called Ummi for Mother and Abi for Father
- Tamazight: Yemma/Ma for mother and Aba/Baba for father

=== Austroasiatic languages ===
- Khmer has different words that indicate different levels of respect. They include the intimate ម៉ាក់ (mak/meak) and ប៉ា (pa), the general ម៉ែ (mai/me) and ពុក (puk), and the formal ម្ដាយ (madaay) and ឪពុក (ovpuk).
- Vietnamese, mẹ is mother and bố is father. Má and ba or cha respectively in Southern Vietnamese.

=== Austronesian languages ===
- Tagalog, mothers can be called ina, and fathers ama. Two other words for the same in common use, nanay and tatay, came from Nahuatl by way of Spanish. Owing to contact with Spanish and English, mamá, papá, ma(m(i)), and dad [dʌd] or dádi are also used. In addition Chinese has influenced the Tagalog languages even before the Spanish Colonial Period; in Old Tagalog the word Baba was used for Father.
- In Malay, mother is called Emak (mak) or Ibu (buk), father is called Bapa (pak), Abah or Ayah. The modern Indonesian word for father is papi and mother is mami. The words mami and papi have been used since the days of the Dutch Indies Colonial, causing the mixing of the words "Papa & Mama", Europe to "Papi & Mami", Indonesia.
- In Māori, Papa is the name of the Earth goddess in the creation myth, and as such is sometimes used to refer to the embodiment of motherhood. The sky father in the same myth is called Rangi.

=== Dravidian languages ===
- Though amma and appa are used in Tulu, they are not really Tulu words but used due to the influence of neighboring states' languages. The actual word for mother in Tulu is appe (pronounced [apæ]) and the word for father in Tulu is amme (pronounced [amæ]). Note that the usage of these words is at odds with the usage pattern in other languages (similar to Georgian in that sense).
- In Telugu, the common words for mother and father are amma and nanna. "Thalli" and "Thandri" are used for mother and father in formal Telugu. Notice how nana refers to maternal grandfather in Hindi, and how that differs from its Telugu meaning. "Nayana" is also used for father in informal Telugu in the Rayalaseema region of Andhra Pradesh and Telangana of India. Note that the usage of these words is at odds with the usage pattern in other languages (similar to Tulu and Georgian in that sense).
- In Malayalam, the common word for mother is "Amma" and for father is "Achan/Appa". In scholastic usage, Mathav and Pithav are used respectively. "Achan" is either a transformed Malayalam equivalent of the Sanskrit "Arya" for "Sir/Master" (Arya - >Ajja -> Acha) or originated from a native Dravidian word that means paternal grandfather (cf. Ajja in Kannada and Ajje in Tulu meaning grandfather and Achan is an uncommon word for father in Tamil). Other words like "Appan","Appachan","Chaachan" (all 3 forms common among Christians, Appan is also used by Hindus of Tamil influenced areas),"Baappa/Vaappa" ,"Uppa" (both common among Muslims) etc. are also used for father, and words such as "Umma" (among Muslims), "Ammachi" (among Christians) for mother. Christians use Achan to mean Church Father."Thalla" which means mother and "Thantha" which means father are currently never used formally and are considered derogatory/disrespectful. "Thaayi" is another old and extremely uncommon word for mother.
- In Tamil, "thaai" and "thanthai" are the formal Tamil words for mother and father; informally "amma" for mother and "appa" for father are much more common. "Aayi" and "Aaththa" for mother and "Ayyan" for father are also used in some dialects.
- In the Kannada language, "thaayi" for mother and "thande" for father are used formally. But to address them informally Kannadigas use amma for mother and appa for father.

=== Uralic languages ===
- Estonian ema for mother and isa for father.
- Hungarian apa means "father" and anya means mother, which tends to use open vowels such as [ɑ] and [ɐ]. For formal usage, these words are applied, but in informal speech, both mama and papa are used as well. For family internal addressing, apu and anyu (variants of "apa" and "anya," respectively) are also used.
- Finnish Äiti and Isä for mother and father, respectively. Also, the old Finnish word 'emä' for 'mother'.

=== Indo-European languages ===
In the Proto-Indo-European language, *méh₂tēr meant "mother" while *ph₂tḗr and *átta meant "father".

==== Romance ====
- Catalan mamà / mama and papà / papa
- French maman / papa (mother / father) and mamie / papy (grandmother / grandfather)
- Friulian mame / pai or papà(mother / father)
- Galician nai, mai / pai
- Italian mamma and papà or babbo
- Lombard mader
- Portuguese mãe / pai (mother / father); Portugal: mamã / papá; Brazil: mamãe / papai
- Romanian mama / mamă (mother) and tata / tată (father)
- Sardinian mama and babbu or formal "Mammai" and "Babbai"
- Spanish mamá and papá

==== Balto-Slavic ====
- Belarusian мама (mama) for mom and тата (tata) for dad.
- Bulgarian мама (mama) for mom and татко (tatko) for dad; майка (maika) for mother and баща (bashta) for father; баба (baba) for grandmother and дядо (dyado) for grandfather.
- Czech máma and táta
- Lithuanian mama / tėtė (mom /dad), motina / tėvas (mother / father).
- Macedonian мама/mama for mom, and татo/tato for dad. мајка/majka for mother, and татко/tatko for father.
- Rusyn мама (mama) for mom and татo (tato) for dad.
- Polish mama and tata
- Russian мама (mama). In Russian papa, deda and baba mean "father", "grandfather" and "grandmother" respectively, though the last two can represent baby-talk (baba is also a slang word for "woman", and a folk word for a married woman with a child born). In popular speech tata and tyatya for "dad" were also used until the 20th century; batya is also still occasionally used to this day. In some dialects, papa means "food".
- Serbo-Croatian mama for mom, and tata for dad.
- Slovak mama / tata, also tato. In addition, papanie / papať means "food" / "eat" respectively.
- Slovene mama / ata, also tata
- Ukrainian мама (mamа) and тато (tato) (папа (papa) in South-eastern dialects).

==== Germanic ====
- Dutch mama / mam / ma and papa / pap / pa
- English mama / mum/mummy (standard British) / mom/mommy (US/Canada/sometimes regional Irish) / momma / mam (regional British and regional Irish) / ma and dad / dada / daddy / papa / pa / da
- Faroese mamma
- German Mama / Mami and Papa / Papi
- Icelandic mamma; pabbi
- Norwegian mamma and pappa
- Swedish mamma and pappa
- Swiss German mami, but mame in the dialect from Graubünden and mamma in certain dialects from the Canton of Bern

==== Celtic ====
- Irish máthair (pronounced [ˈmˠaːhəɾʲ]) / áthair
- Scottish Gaelic màthair ([ˈmaːhəɾʲ]) / athair ([ˈahəɾʲ])
- Welsh mam / tad (mutates to dad)
- Breton mamm (mutates to vamm) / tad (mutates to dad or zad)

==== Indo-Aryan ====
Old Indo-Aryan (Sanskrit): Mātṛ / Ambā for "mother" and Pitṛ / Tātaḥ for "father".

- Assamese has ma ("মা") and aai ("আই") as "mother" and deuta ("দেউতা") and pitai ("পিতাই") as "father". However, due to English borrowings, the words mamma and pappa are sometimes used today.
- Bengali, the words maa ("মা") and baba ("বাবা") are used for "mother" and "father".
- Bhojpuri has maai ("माई") and aama ("आमा") as "mother" and babu ("बाबू") as "father". Informally, the terms mami and papa are also used, possibly due to English influence.
- In Doteli language, "eeja" is used for mother while "buwa" or "baa" is used for father.
- Gujarati uses mātā, or mā, for mother and bāpuji, or pitā, for father. Informally, the terms mammi and pappā are also used, possibly due to English influence.
- Hindi has the word mātā or mātājī for mother and pitājī for father in formal usage, though the informal terms maa and baba are often used. When referring to a father, baap and pita (without the -ji suffix) are also used but not as salutations. Due to English borrowings, the words mamma and pappa are also common.
- Kashmiri, Mauj/mauji for mother is used in both formal and informal language where as Moul for father in formal and Baabé/Baba in informal language.
- Konkani language, the word "aai" for "mother" and "baba" "father" are used, given the language's close similarity to Marathi. However, due to English borrowings, the words mamma and pappa are much more common today.
- Kumaoni Language "eeja" is the word used for mother while the words "baba" or "bouju" are used for father
- Maithili language has the word Mami and Papa to refer mother and father respectively, which were borrowed from English and are very popular in Madesh state of Nepal and Bihar state of India.
- Marathi Aai (“आई”) for mother and Baba (“बाबा”) for father. In some parts of Maharashtra Amma ("अम्मा") for mother and Appa ("अप्पा") or Tatya ("तात्या") for father is also used. However, due to English borrowings, the words mummy and pappa are much more common today in urban areas.
- Nepali language has the words Aama ("आमा") or Ma ("मा") to refer to mother and Buwa ("बुवा"), Buba ("बुबा"), Baba ("बाबा"), or Ba ("बा") for father. Generally, the former word or words are considered more formal and respectful than the latter. Mummy ("मम्मी") and Papa ("पापा") is also common as English loan words.
- Odia uses bapa (ବାପା) for father and maa(ମା), bou (ବୋଉ) for mother. However, due to English borrowings, the words mamma/mommy and pappa are much more common today.
- Sinhalese, the word for mother originally was "abbe" ("abbiyande") and father was "appa " ("appanande"). Use of "amma" for mother and "nana" for father is due to heavy influence of Tamil. In some areas of Sri Lanka, particularly in the Central Province, Sinhalese use the word "nanachhi", or "thaththa" for father.
- Urdu the words for mother are maa/mɑ̃ː ماں, madar مادر or walida والدہ formally and ammi امی, mama مما informally, whereas father is baap باپ (not used as salutation), pedar' پدر or 'walid' والد formally and baba بابا or abba ابّا or abbu ابّو informally.

==== Iranian ====
- Balochi: مات (mat) is the formal word for mother, with the informal being اما (ama); پت (pit) is the formal word for father, with the informal being بابا (baba).
- Pashto: مور (mūr) is the word for mother, پلار (plār) is the word for father and بابا (bābā) is used for father as well.
- Persian:
  - In Persian, مادر (mâdar) is the word for mother and پدر (pedar) is the word for father in formal speech. Informally, the word for "mama" is مامان (mâmân), a French loanword, or a natural variant such as ماما (mâmâ) and the word for "papa" is بابا (bâbâ). However, some Iranian dialects use ننه (nane, nene) for "mama."
  - In Dari, just like Iranian Persian, مادر (mâdar) and پدر (padar, pidar) are the words for "mother" and "father" respectively in formal speech. Informally, ننه (nana) for "mama" and بابا (bâbâ) for "papa" are used.
    - Hazaragi آبه (âba) is used for mother and آته (âta) is used for father.
- Kurdish dayê and yadê or dê is the word for mother.
- Luri دا dā and دالکه dāleka is the word for mother, and bowa or bawa is the word for father.

==== Other Indo-European languages ====
- Albanian nena/nëna, mama for mother and tat/at, baba for father
- (Modern) Greek μάνα, μαμά (mána, mamá) and μπαμπάς (babás)
- Hittite 𒀭𒈾𒀸 (annaš, "mother") and 𒀜𒋫𒀸 (attaš, "father")

=== Kartvelian languages ===
- Georgian is notable for having its similar words "backwards" compared to other languages: "father" in Georgian is მამა (mama), while "mother" is pronounced as დედა (deda). პაპა papa stands for "grandfather".

=== Mayan languages ===
- Ch'ol: ña
- Tzotzil: me'
- Tzeltal: me

=== Atlantic-Congo languages ===
- Igbo: Mama / Nne / Nma
- Swahili: Mama and Baba
- Yoruba: Màmá / Ìyá and Bàbá
- Zulu: Mama and Baba

=== Sino-Tibetan languages ===
- Bodo, बिमा (bi-ma) and बिफा (bi-fa) are the words for "mother" and "father" respectively. However, parents are usually referred to by their children as आइ/आइयै (aai/aywi) or मा (ma) and आफा (afa) or बाबा (baba) — "Mom" and "Dad."
- Burmese, မိခင် (mi khin) and ဖခင် (pha khin) are the words for "mother" and "father" respectively. However, parents are usually referred to by their children as မေမေ (may may) and ဖေဖေ (phay phay) — "Mom" and "Dad."
- Cantonese, 母親 (móuchàn) and 父親 (fuchàn) are the formal words for "mother" and "father" respectively. 媽媽 (màmà) or 阿媽 (a mā) and 爸爸 (bàbā) or 阿爸 (a bà) are used informally for "Mom" and "Dad" respectively.
- Mandarin Chinese, 母親 (pinyin: mǔqīn) and 父親 (fùqīn) are for "mother" and "father" respectively. Note that the f sound was pronounced bilabially (as with p or b) in older and some other forms of Chinese, thus fu is related to the common "father" word pa. In addition, parents are usually referred to by their children as 媽媽 (pinyin: māma; Wade–Giles: ma¹-ma) and 爸爸 (pinyin: bàba; Wade–Giles: pa⁴-pa) — "Mom" and "Dad". In informal language, mā and bà are sometimes used as shorter versions of the aforementioned words.
- Taiwanese Hokkien, 老母 (lāu-bú) and 老爸 (lāu-pē) refer to "mother" and "father" respectively. Note that some of the b sounds in modern Taiwanese was pronounced as m in older Chinese languages, hence bú is related to the common "mother" word m. Additionally, parents are also referred as 媽 (má) / 阿母 (a-bú) and 爸 (pâ) / 阿爸 (a-pah), equivalents to "Mom" and "Dad", respectively.
- Hakka Chinese uses "â-pâ - â-mê" （阿爸阿姆） for father and mother. In the Meixian dialect mother is called "â-mà" (阿嫲). Other term is "fu-mû" (父母) or yà-ôi (爺ôi) for parents or both father and mother.
- Tibetan uses amma for mother and nana for father.
- Tani uses "ané" for mother and "abu/abo" for father.
- Despite being a Tibeto-Burman language, Newari uses "maa" for mother and "baa" for father, similar to Nepali due to continuous interaction with Nepali speakers.

=== Kra–Dai languages ===
- Thai, "mother" is แม่ (mê [mɛ̂ː]) and "father" is พ่อ (phô [pʰɔ̂ː]). มะ (Má [mɑ]) and บะ (ba [ba]) or ฉะ (cha [tʃa]) respectively in Southern Thai. Colloquially, mamà and papà are also used.
- Lao, "mother" is ແມ່ (maê) and "father" is ພໍ່ (phô).

=== Turkic languages ===
- In Turkish, both anne and ana mean mother, and baba and ata means father. Also, aneane or "ane-ane" (the word for mother duplicated to symbolise descent. Anne means mother and to address them (mothers) you can use Annem that means my mother "citations needed" can be used for grandma and dede for grandpa.
- Uyghur, an East Asian Turkic language, uses ana or apa for mother, and ata or dada for father.
- In the Crimean Tatar language, the word Ana means mother, and the word Baba means father.

=== Other families and language isolates ===
- Basque: ama for mother and aita for father.
- Japanese, 父 (chichi < *titi) and 母 (haha < *papa; modern Japanese /h/ derives from the voiceless bilabial fricative *[ɸ] which in turn is from the older *[p]) for "father" and "mother" respectively in formal style. They are basic words which do not combine with honorifics. Japanese has also borrowed informal mama and papa along with the native terms, stemming from American influence post-World War II. Before the borrowing became common, a child usually called its mother おかあさん (okāsan), かあちゃん (kāchan), vel sim., and its father おとうさん (otōsan), とうちゃん (tōchan), etc.. On the other hand, マンマ (mamma) means “food” in baby talk.
- Okinawan language, the word あんま (anma) is used to refer to mother while ふぁふぁ (fafa) refers to father.
- Korean, 엄마 (eom-ma) and 아빠 (a-bba) are mom and dad in informal language, whereas the formal words are 아버지 (a-beo-ji) and 어머니 (eo-meo-ni) for father and mother.
- Kutenai, a language isolate of southeastern British Columbia, uses the word ma.
- Sumerian: 𒀀𒈠 / ama
- Mapudungun: Chachay and papay are respectively "daddy" and "mommy"; chaw and ñuke being "father" and "mother", respectively. Chachay and papay are also terms of respect or sympathy towards other members of the community.

== See also ==
- Ab (Semitic)
- Onomatopoeia
