= Nana (Greek mythology) =

Daughter of the Phrygian river-god Sangarius in Greek mythology

In Greek mythology, Nana (/ˈneɪnə/ (Ancient Greek: Νάνα) is a daughter of the Phrygian river-god Sangarius, identified with the river Sakarya located in present-day Turkey.

== Mythology ==
She became pregnant when an almond from an almond tree fell on her lap. The almond tree had sprung from the spot where the hermaphroditic Agdistis was castrated, becoming Cybele, the Mother of the Gods.

Nana abandoned the baby boy, who was tended by a he-goat. The baby, Attis, grew up to become Cybele's consort and lover.

== See also ==
- Danae
- Liber
- Maya Hero Twins
- Myrrha

== Bibliography ==
- Arnobius, Adversus Nationes, (the source for character's name).
- Pausanias, Description of Greece, with an English Translation by W.H.S. Jones, Litt.D., and H.A. Ormerod, M.A., in 4 Volumes. Cambridge, MA, Harvard University Press; London, William Heinemann Ltd. 1918. Online version at the Perseus Digital Library.
