= Vindicta Salvatoris =

New Testament apocryphon

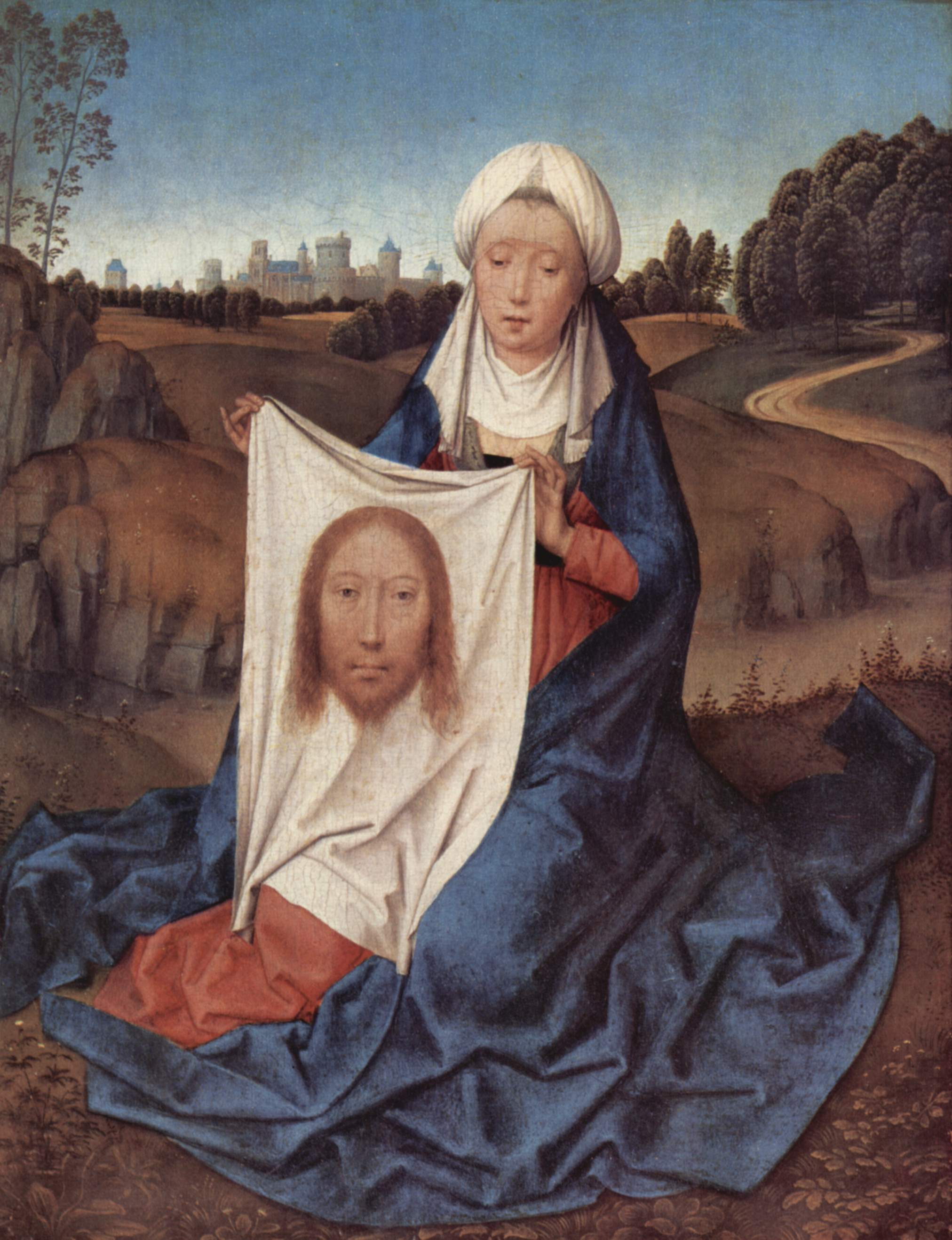
Saint Veronica and the Veil of Veronica miraculously imprinted with the face of Jesus. Hans Memling, about 1470 (National Gallery of Art, Washington, D.C.)

Vindicta Salvatoris (In English: The Avenging of the Saviour or The Vengeance of the Saviour) is a text of New Testament Apocrypha that expands the story of the aftermath of Jesus's execution. It was often presented as a supplement to the Gospel of Nicodemus. The oldest known copies are two Latin versions of the Vindicta Salvatoris, both dated to the 8th or 9th centuries and likely when the work was authored. The work is thought to have been composed in southern France, perhaps the Aquitaine region.

The Vindicta Salvatoris is a virulently anti-Jewish work. According to it, the Jews are collectively guilty of the crime of killing Christ, and deserve torment and death. Divine favour will come to Christians who mete out God's justice on the Jews by killing them. The work also includes a retelling of the story of Saint Veronica's miraculous veil, imprinted with the face of Jesus, from the slightly earlier Cura sanitatis Tiberii legend.

The story depicts the conversion of Titus to Christianity, Titus' siege of Jerusalem, the suicide of Herod the Great, the executions of Caiaphas and Herod Archelaus, and the imprisonment of Pontius Pilate in Damascus. A second part depicts the conversion of Tiberius to Christianity.

== Content ==
In The Vengeance of the Saviour, Nathan, an Ishmaelite (Arab), leaves Judea and travels the Empire to collect a tribute for Emperor Tiberius. Winds blow him off-course north to the kingdom of "Libiae". There, Tyrus is a local ruler "in the kingdom of Aquitania, for a city of Libia which is called Burdigala"; he is ill with cancer in his nose and a mangled face. Nathan tells Tyrus of Jesus's miracles, trial, execution, saving of the human race from hell, and resurrection. Tyrus converts to Christianity on the spot. He swears that if he had known earlier, he would have avenged his death, killed Jesus's enemies, and hung their bodies from a dry tree. This vow of vengeance immediately cures Tyrus's cancer and restores his face.

After he is baptized by Nathan, Tyrus changes his name to Titus. Titus sends for Vespasian and the two leave Burdigala with an army and besiege Jerusalem for seven years. Amid the famine from the long siege, King Herod the Great commits suicide. Many of the Jews, following Herod's lead, commit mass suicide. The Jews agree that the Holy Land is no longer theirs, and that Christ has taken it from them to give to the Romans. After the city falls, various gory fates befall the remaining Jews: some are quartered into four pieces (as Jesus's clothing had been divided); some are speared; some are stoned; some are hanged; and the remaining are enslaved and sold at a rate of 30 Jews for one silver piece, in reference to the thirty pieces of silver paid to Judas Iscariot. Caiaphas and Herod's son Archelaus are stoned to death, and Pontius Pilate is imprisoned and thrown in an iron cage in Damascus.

After this, the story switches into a retelling of the Cura sanitatis Tiberii, a work of the 6th or 7th century. Emperor Tiberius sends his emissary Volosianus (or Velosianus) to Jerusalem to investigate stories of Jesus. He interrogates Joseph of Arimathea, Nicodemus, Simeon, and Pontius Pilate. Angered at what he has learned, Volosianus has Pilate thrown in an iron cage (again) for killing the perfect man, and orders his punishment by the foulest death. Volosianus also finds Saint Veronica, and takes her portrait of Jesus from her to bring back to Tiberius. Veronica insists on going on the boat with him so that she doesn't lose her image of Jesus. At court, Volosianus describes how the guilty Jews have been punished. He directly urges that just as the Jews have killed Christ, let believers do to them: the Jews should be killed with the foulest death and their names erased from the Earth. Veronica's portrait then heals Emperor Tiberius of his leprosy. Tiberius and his household are baptized as Christians.

=== Factual issues ===
The work, while taken seriously at the time, is closer to a historical novel and has major variances from history. According to it, Tyrus/Titus is a ruler of "Libiae", a word which would usually refer to Libya, that is, Roman North Africa. However, the work also claims that "Libiae" is to the north of Judea, while Africa is to the southwest of Judea. It has been proposed that perhaps the author was using a unique spelling of Albi in Southern France with "Libiae", which would also explain the reference to Burdigala (Bourdeaux) and Aquitania. Part of why the work is theorized to be written in Aquitaine is the ahistorical attempt to tie Titus to the region; this may have been an attempt to include the author's original audience in the story by making Titus a Gallic ruler.

The work calls Auster the north wind, but it is the southern wind. The story of Volosianus and Veronica does not appear closely connected to the story of Titus and Vespasian before it, as it does not seem to take place within the smoking ruins of Jerusalem. Volosianus is able to interview Pilate in Jerusalem despite the narrative of the Jewish-Roman war leaving Pilate in Damascus. The work also compresses hundreds of years of history into a single story. Herod the Great, here referred to as still King of Judea, died around 3 or 4 BC; Tiberius's reign ended in 37 AD; Vespasian and Titus conducted the First Jewish–Roman War from 66 to 73 CE; and Roman emperors did not convert to Christianity until the time of Constantine.

== Manuscript history ==
The story was widely known in medieval western Europe. There are Anglo-Saxon and Old French translations. The Vindicta Salvatoris was also the main source for two religious epics, La Destruction de Jérusalem, a chanson de geste in Old French, and The Siege of Jerusalem, an alliterative poem in Middle English.

Constantin von Tischendorf was one of the earliest and most influential compilers of ancient Church documents and legends, finding old manuscripts and codices and putting them in modern printed form. He published a version of the Vindicta Salvatoris in his 1853 (2nd edition in 1876) work Evangelia apocrypha, a collection of Greek and Latin texts. Tischendorf published a copy of Latin versions from the 14th and 15th century, although he noted some deviations from an even older 11th century Anglo-Saxon (Old English) manuscript, which was the oldest available at the time. Tischendorf included the work in the Pilate cycle of apocrypha; while Pilate is not a major player in the work, it matches other features of Pilate literature, such as the inclusion of the Veronica legend and a focus on the aftermath of Jesus's execution. Since the 1870s, both older and newer copies have been discovered, notably the Saint-Omer Latin manuscript from the 9th century. Scholars estimate the work may have been written in the 8th century, with the Saint-Omer version a comparatively early copy of it. Of sixty ancient manuscripts discovered, around one third of them included the work directly with the Gospel of Nicodemus.

A longer version of the Vindicta Salvatoris was published in 1996 based on later, expanded manuscripts, although a summary of the longer version was published in 1932. In this version Titus is sub-king of Bordeaux and Pilate is eventually imprisoned in Vienne (both cities in modern France), where he is kept in darkness and is forbidden any cooked food. Eventually he asks for an apple and a knife with which to peel it, and commits suicide by stabbing himself with the knife. The people of Vienne, after several failed attempts to rid themselves of his body, manage to do so by floating it down the Rhone in a barrel. It strikes a rock, which opens to engulf Pilate's body.

== See also ==
- Medieval antisemitism
