= Cura sanitatis Tiberii =

New Testament apocryphon

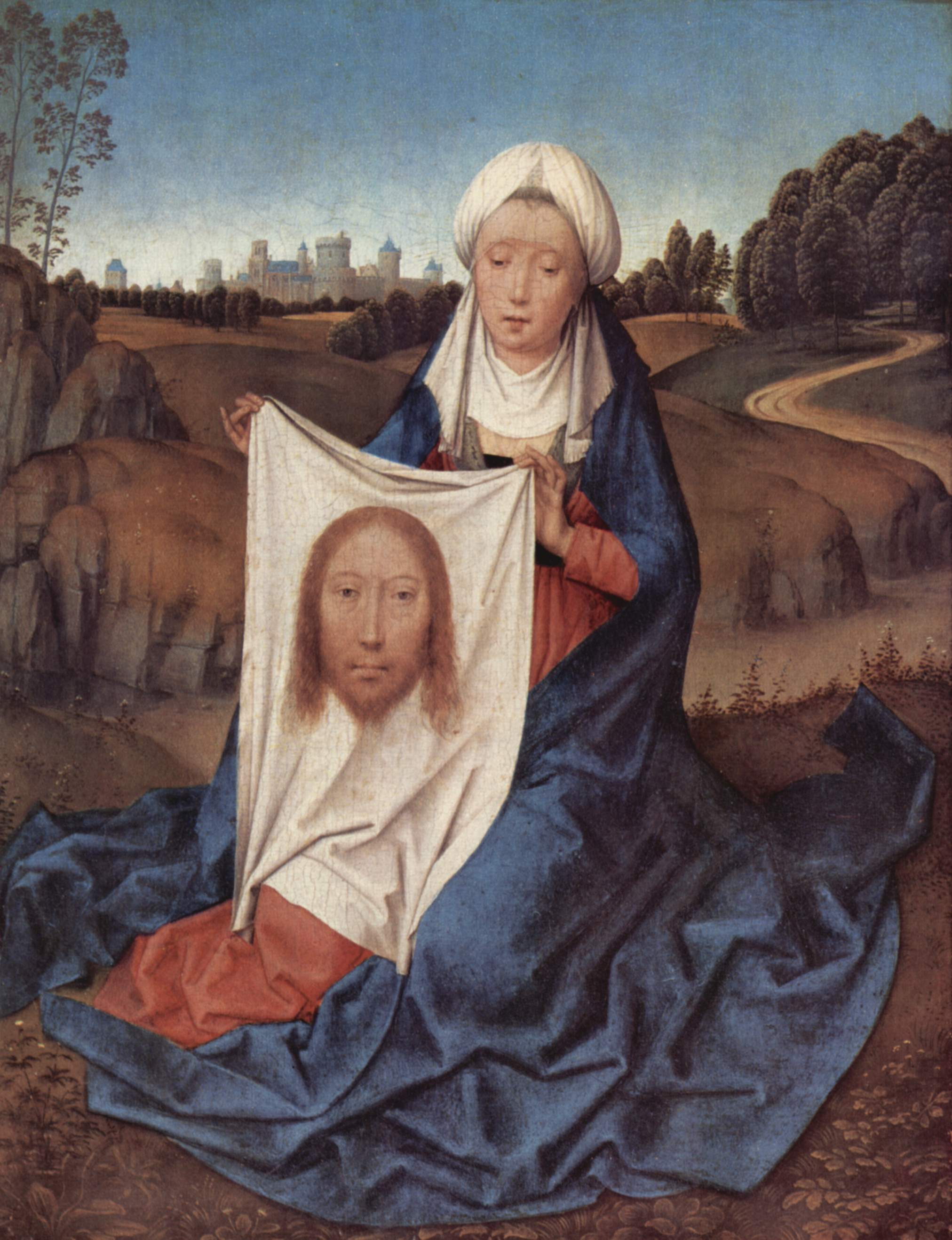
Saint Veronica and the veil miraculously imprinted with the face of Jesus. Hans Memling, about 1470 (National Gallery of Art, Washington, D.C.)

Cura sanitatis Tiberii ("The cure of the health of Tiberius") is a short legendary text which, like other supplements to the Gospel of Nicodemus, is grouped among the New Testament Apocrypha.

== Narrative ==
According to the narrative, the Roman emperor Tiberius, gravely ill, sent Volusianus to Judea to search for Jesus, who was reported to be able to cure all sicknesses. Volusianus learned in Judea that the provincial governor Pontius Pilate had recently allowed the Jews to put Jesus to death. Despairing of success, Volusianus then heard that Veronica possessed a miraculous veil imprinted with the face of Jesus. This veil restored Tiberius to health. Accepting the truth of Christianity, Tiberius punished Pilate by banishing him to Amelia.

Tiberius's third successor, Nero, learning more about Jesus from the apostle Peter, recalled Pilate to answer new questions. Having pieced together the full story, Nero confirmed Pilate's sentence of exile. Pilate then committed suicide.

== Origin of the Veil of Veronica legend ==
Cura sanitatis Tiberii, thought to have been composed between the 5th and 7th centuries, is the earliest known written form of the widespread medieval legend of Veronica's veil, which was soon afterwards reworked in the better-known text Vindicta Salvatoris ("The Avenging of the Saviour").

== Publication ==
The Latin text of Cura sanitatis Tiberii was published twice in the 19th century. An edition of a medieval French manuscript version appeared in 1993 alongside a study of the legends about Pontius Pilate. An English translation, by Tuomas Levänen, was recently published online.
