= Old English Gospel of Nicodemus =

The Old English Gospel of Nicodemus is an Old English prose translation of the Latin Gospel of Nicodemus. The Old English Gospel of Nicodemus is preserved in two manuscripts (the Cambridge University manuscript and the Cotton Vitellius A. 15 manuscript in the British Library), both dating from the 11th century AD. In comparison to the Latin edition from which they are based, the manuscripts contain both minor and major differences, including various omissions and addition of numerous words, clauses, and sentences.

The Old English Gospel of Nicodemus contains "a sex-changed version of the grammatically masculine but otherwise ambiguous figure Infer[n]us" referred to as Seo hell, who engages in flyting with Satan, and orders him to leave "her" dwelling (Old English ut of mynre onwununge), and states that "her vivid personification in a dramatically excellent scene suggests that her gender is more than grammatical, and invites comparison with the Old Norse underworld goddess Hel and the Frau Holle of German folklore, to say nothing of underworld goddesses in other cultures." Bell says that "the possibility that these genders are merely grammatical is strengthened by the fact that an Old Norse version of Nicodemus, possibly translated under English influence, personifies Hell in the neuter (Old Norse þat helviti)".

Bell says that "to complicate the picture still further, personification itself is sporadic in the tradition" and that "in some redactions of the Latin and Old Norse Nicodemus, Hell's speaking part is taken by various loosely identified groups of denizens of the underworld," adding that Hell only appears additionally personified in the latest and most fragmentary of the four surviving Old Norse manuscripts of The Gospel of Nicodemus.

== See also ==
- Bartholomeus saga postola
- The Old English Gospel of Nichodemus on archive.org
