= Ángel María Cortellini =

Spanish painter (1819–1887)

- Born: 1819; Sanlucar de Barrameda, Spain
- Died: 1887 (aged 67–68); Madrid, Spain
- Education: Seville Royal Academy of Fine Arts
- Known for: Painting

Ángel María Cortellini Hernández (1819 – 1887) was a Spanish painter. He received the gold medal of the National Exhibition for his painting, Retrato de señora.

== Life ==
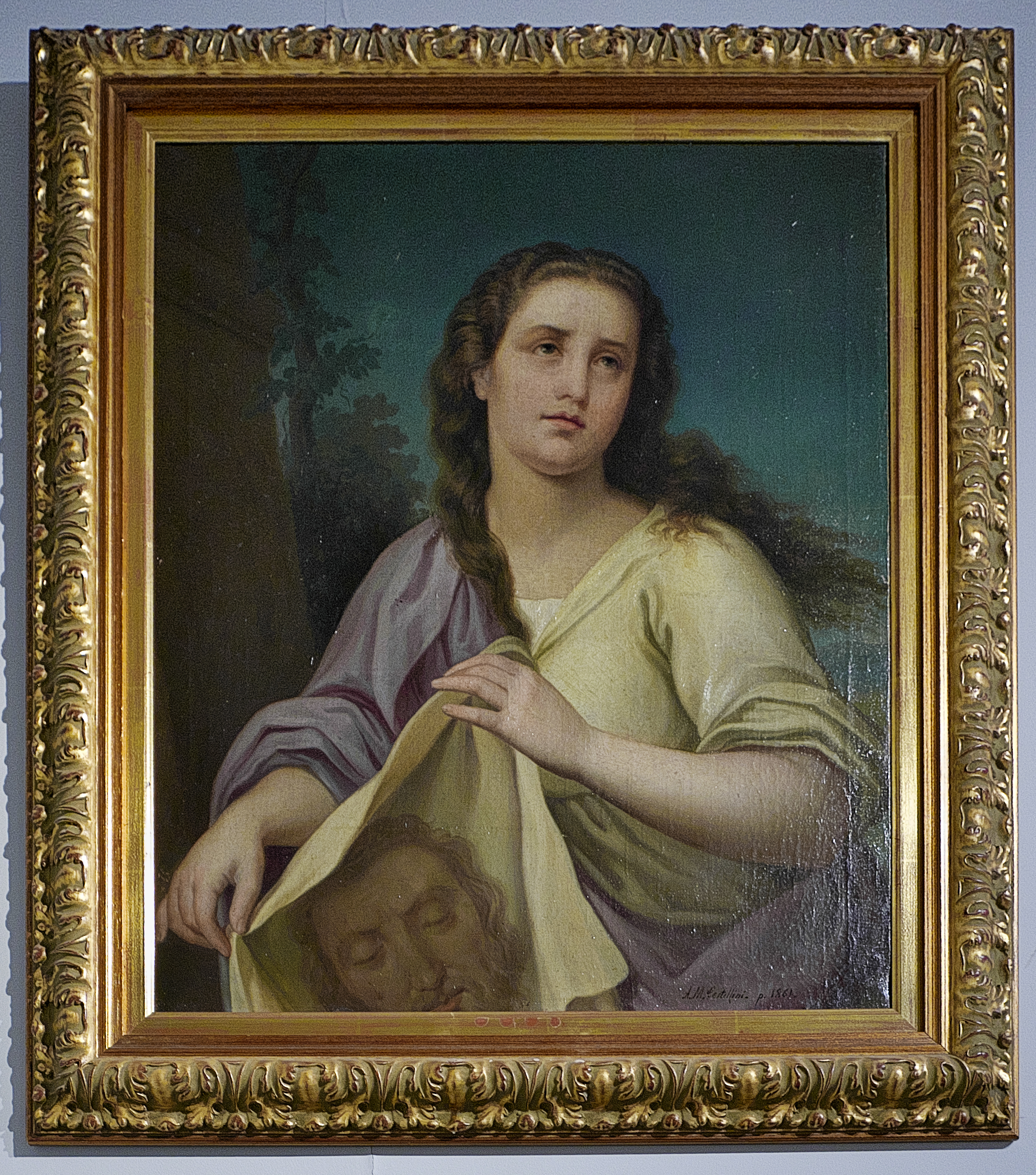
La Verónica (Saint Veronica)

Ángel María Cortellini Hernández was born in Sanlúcar de Barrameda, Province of Cádiz in 1819. He was the son of an Italian from the Piedmont region who had married a woman of Cadiz. He trained in drawing at an early age before becoming a pupil of Joaquín Domínguez Bécquer. At the age of 17, he traveled to Italy, stopping in Turin, Milan, and Genoa. After two years, he returned to Seville to continue his training, which continued at the Seville Royal Academy of Fine Arts. In 1847, he moved to Madrid, settling there permanently.

The following year, he exhibited at the Real Academia de Bellas Artes de San Fernando and the Liceo Artístico y Literario. After receiving an appointment in 1850 as the honorary court painter, he created portraits of Queen Isabel II and her husband Francisco de Asis de Bourbon.

== Awards ==
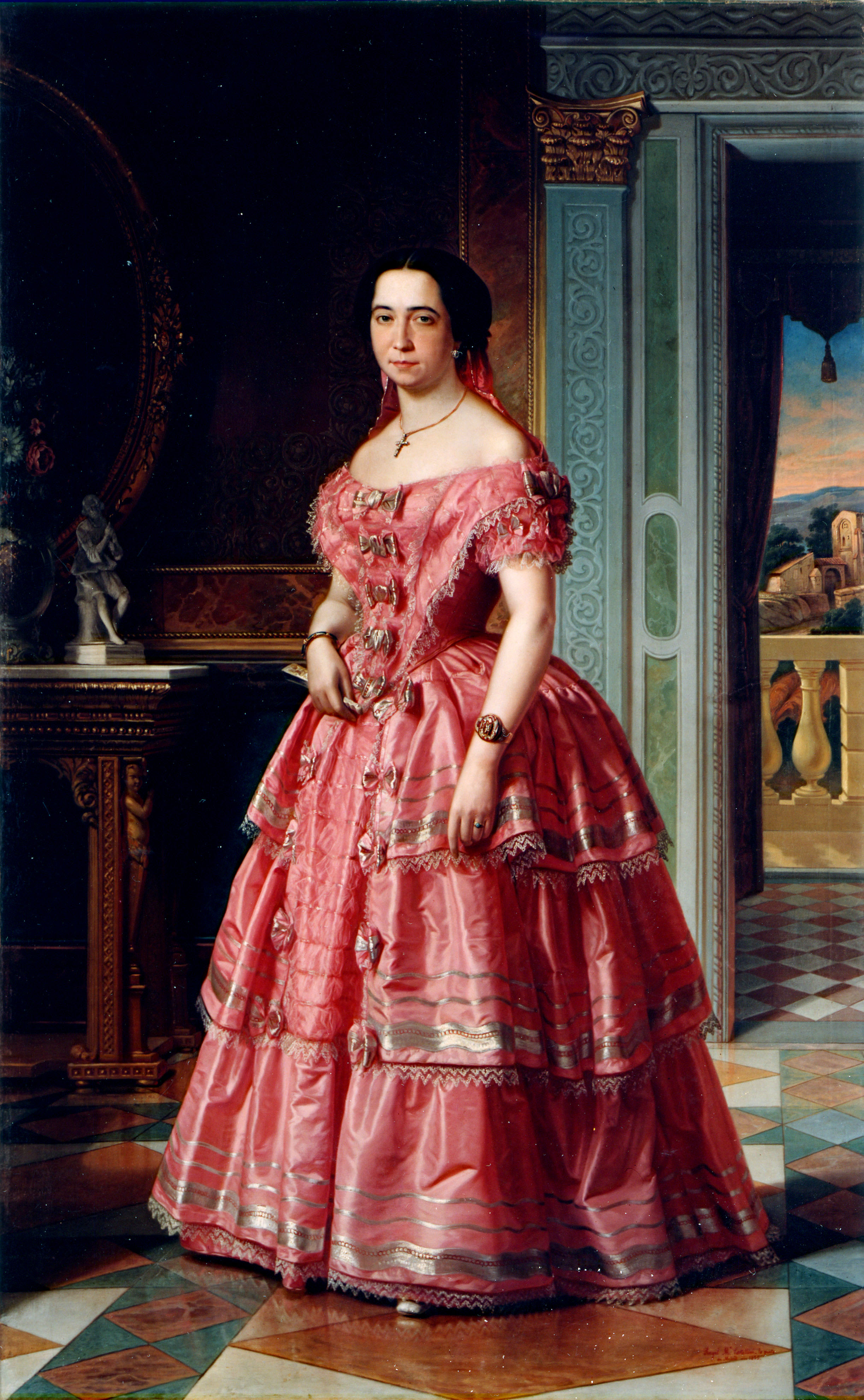
Retrato de señora (Portrait of Lady), by Ángel María Cortellini Hernández

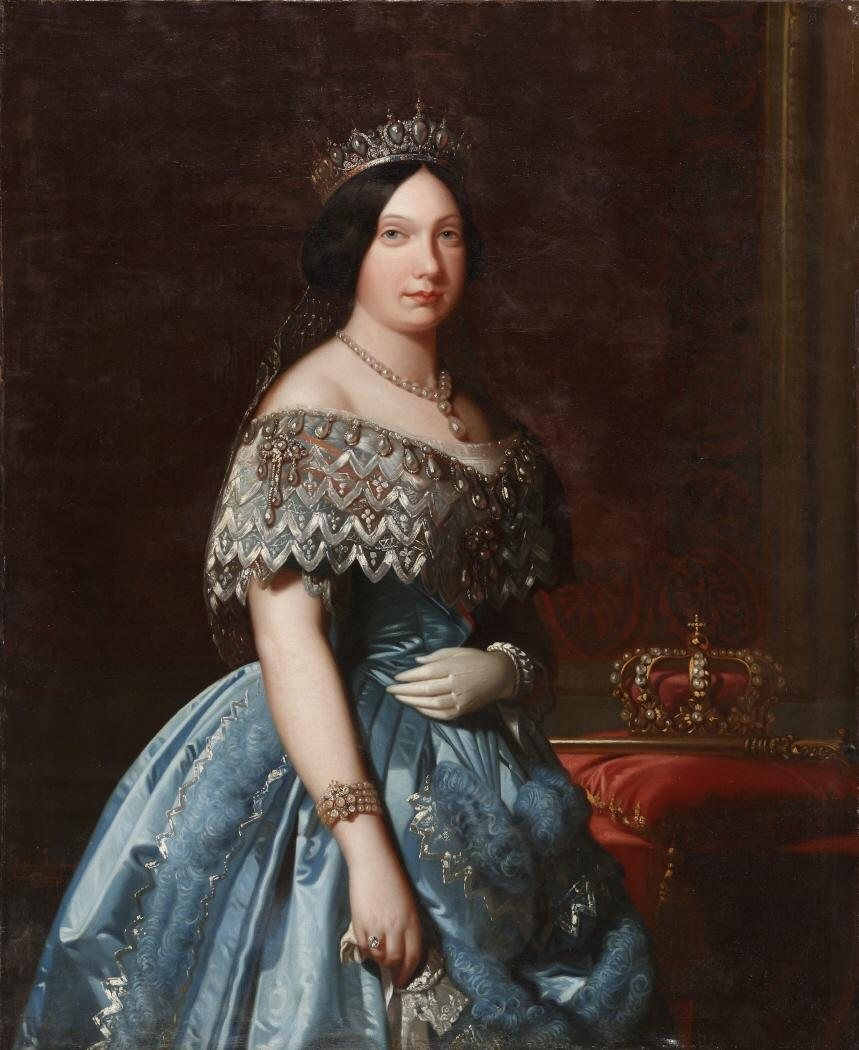
La reina Isabel II de España (Queen Isabella II of Spain)

In 1866, he received the gold medal of the National Exhibition for Retrato de señora, and a similar award in 1871 for La batalla de Wad-Ras. He died in Madrid in 1887.

== Gallery ==
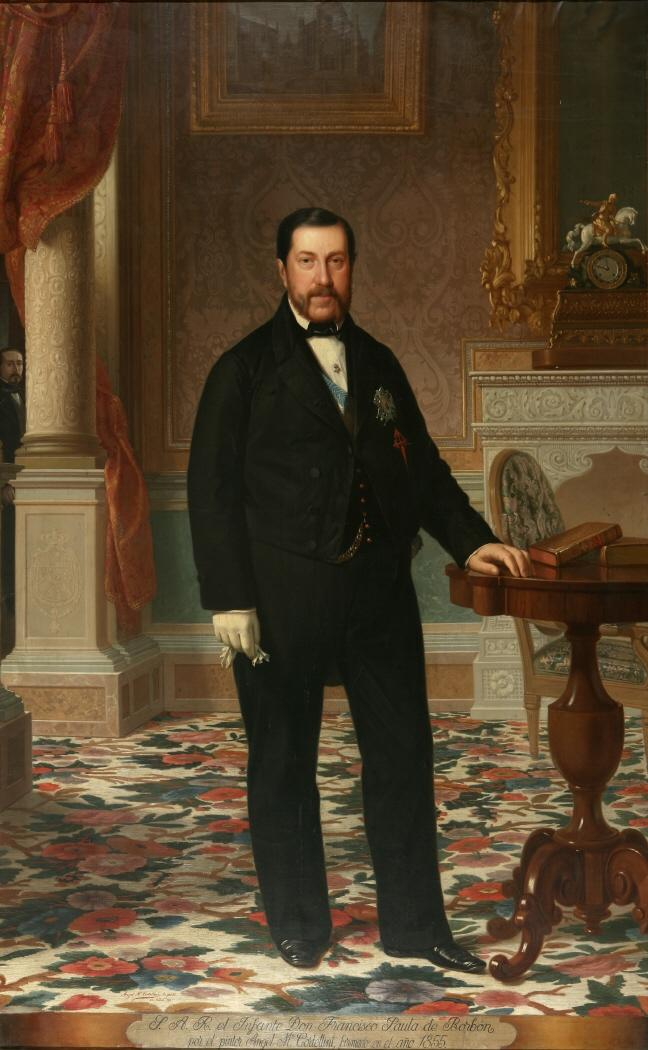
Portrait of Francisco de Paula de Borbón

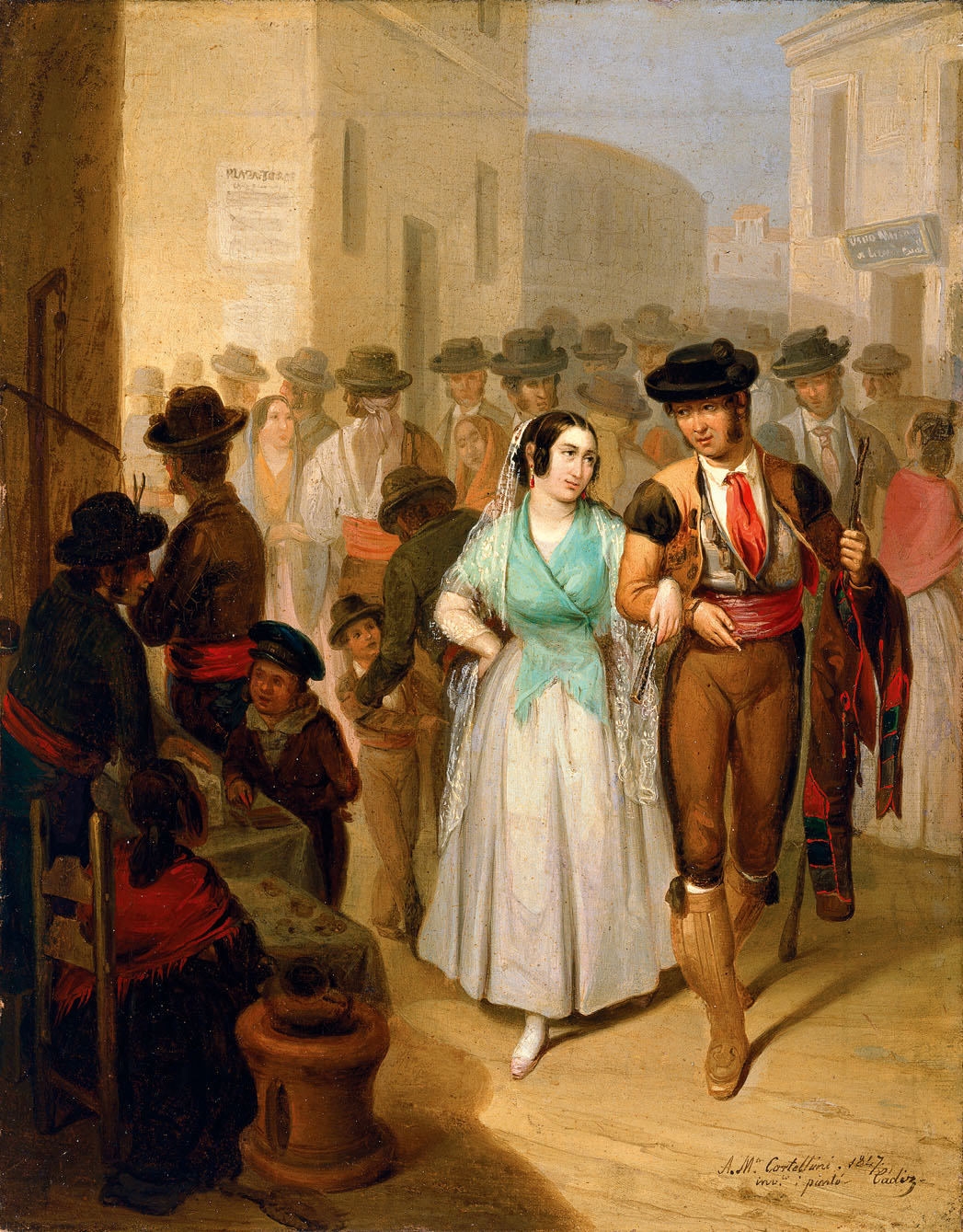
Leaving the bullring

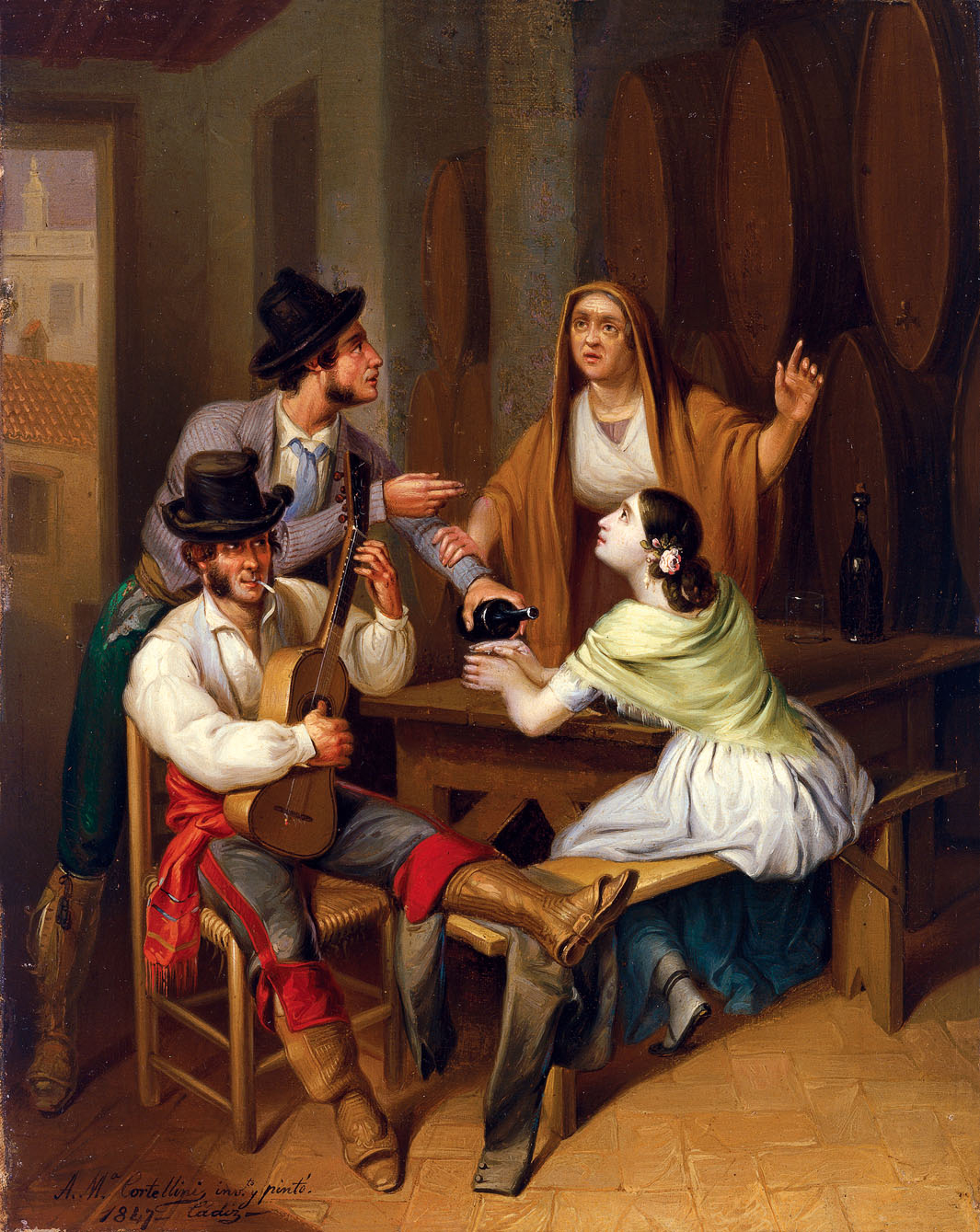
No more wine

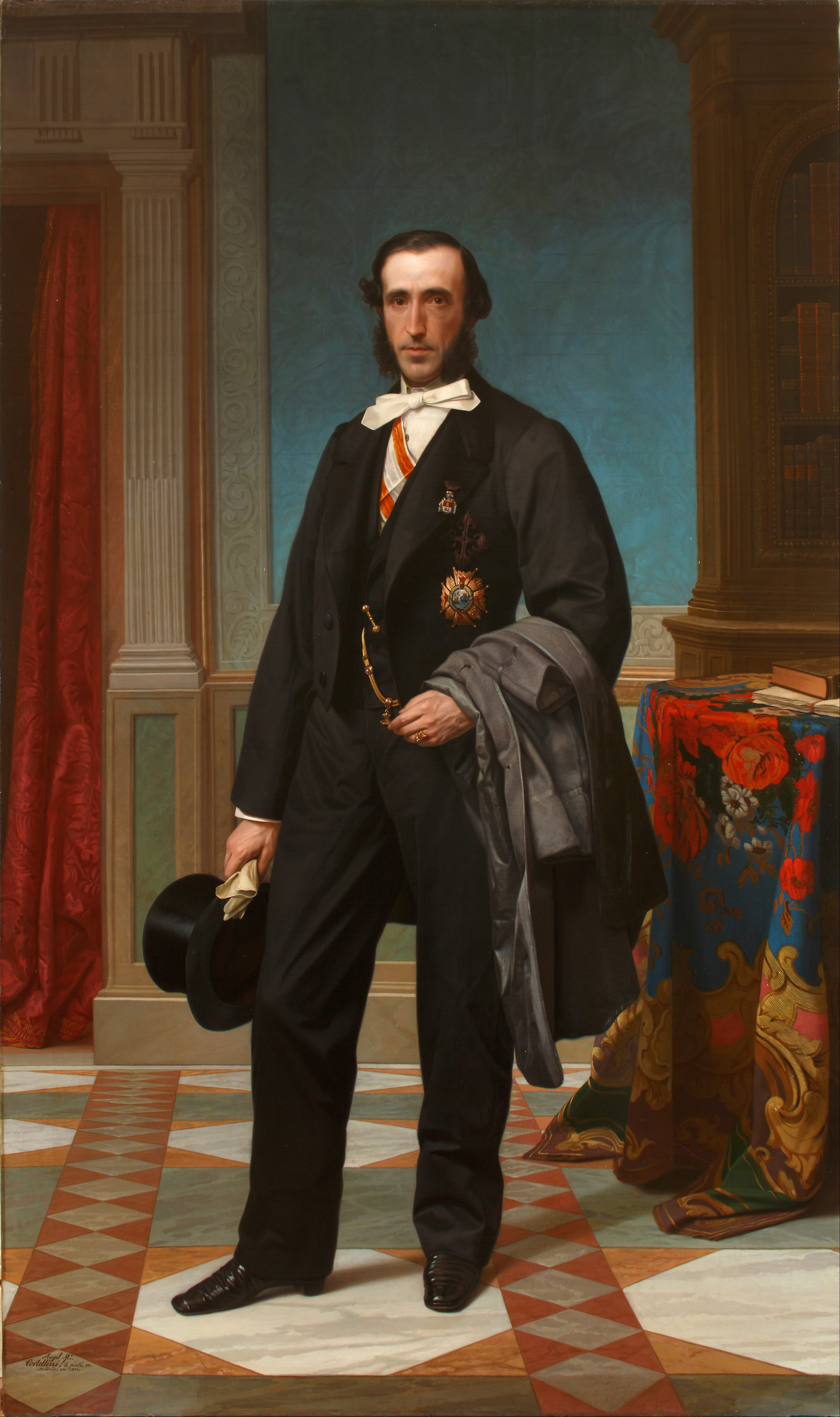
Portrait of Basilio de Chávarri
