= Saint Veronica =

Christian saint

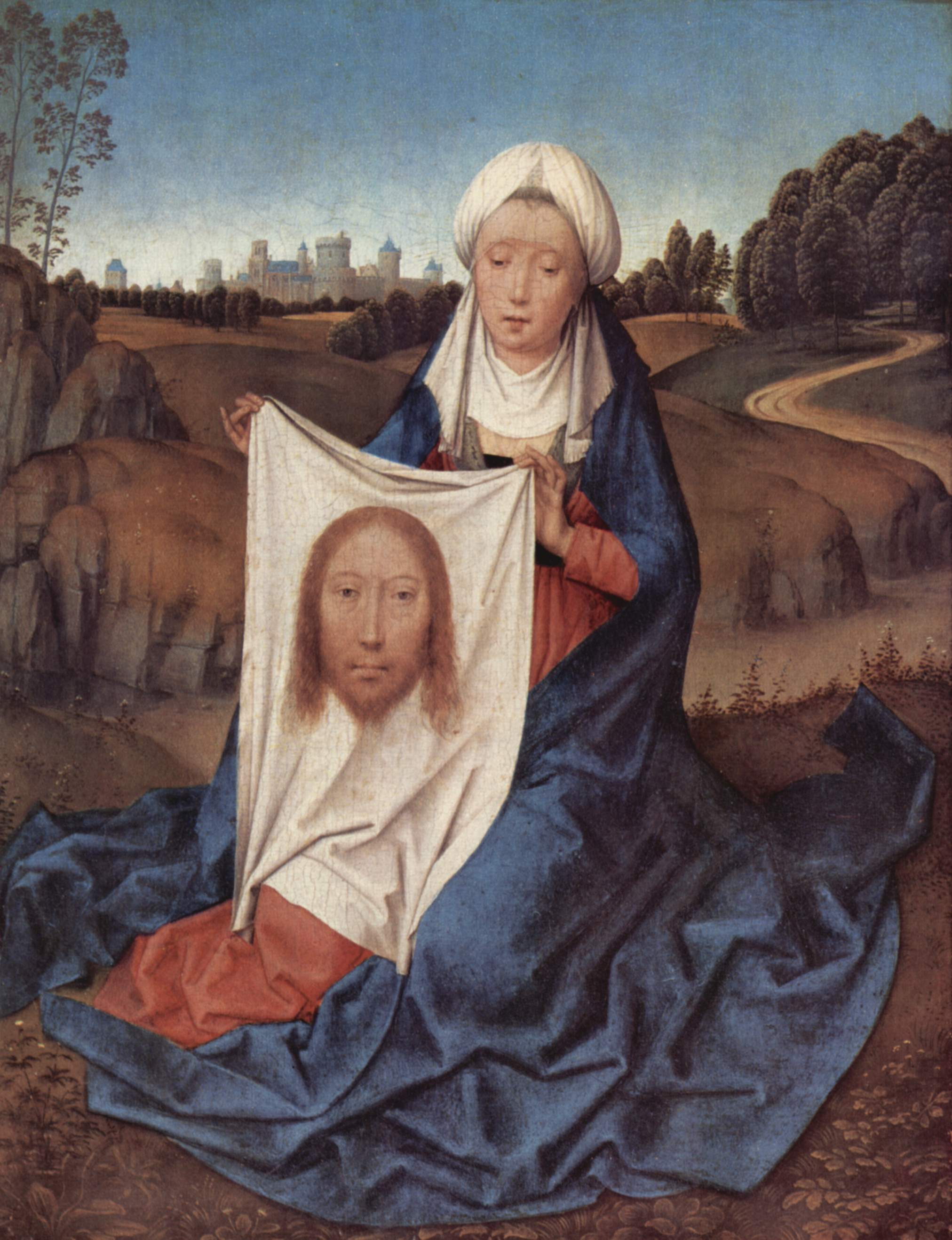
- Saint Veronica, by Hans Memling, c. 1470
- Born: 1st century AD; Caesarea Philippi or Jerusalem, Judea
- Venerated in: Catholic Church, Eastern Orthodox Church, Evangelical-Lutheran Churches, Anglican Communion
- Canonized: Pre-Congregation
- Feast: July 12
- Attributes: Cloth that bears the image of Christ's face
- Patronage: images; laundry workers, pictures, photos, photographers, Santa Veronica, San Pablo City, Laguna province

Saint Veronica, also known as Berenike, was a widow from Jerusalem who lived in the 1st century AD, according to extra-biblical Christian traditions. Apocryphal texts relate how Veronica was moved with sympathy seeing Jesus carrying the cross to Calvary and gave him her veil so that he could wipe his forehead. Jesus accepted the offer, and when he returned the veil the image of his face was miraculously captured on it. The resulting relic became known as the Veil of Veronica.

The story of Veronica is celebrated in the sixth Station of the Cross in Anglican, Evangelical-Lutheran, Catholic, and Western Orthodox churches. A celebrated saint in many pious Christian countries, the 17th-century Acta Sanctorum published by the Bollandists listed her feast under July 12, but the German Jesuit scholar Joseph Braun cited her commemoration in Festi Marianni on January 13.

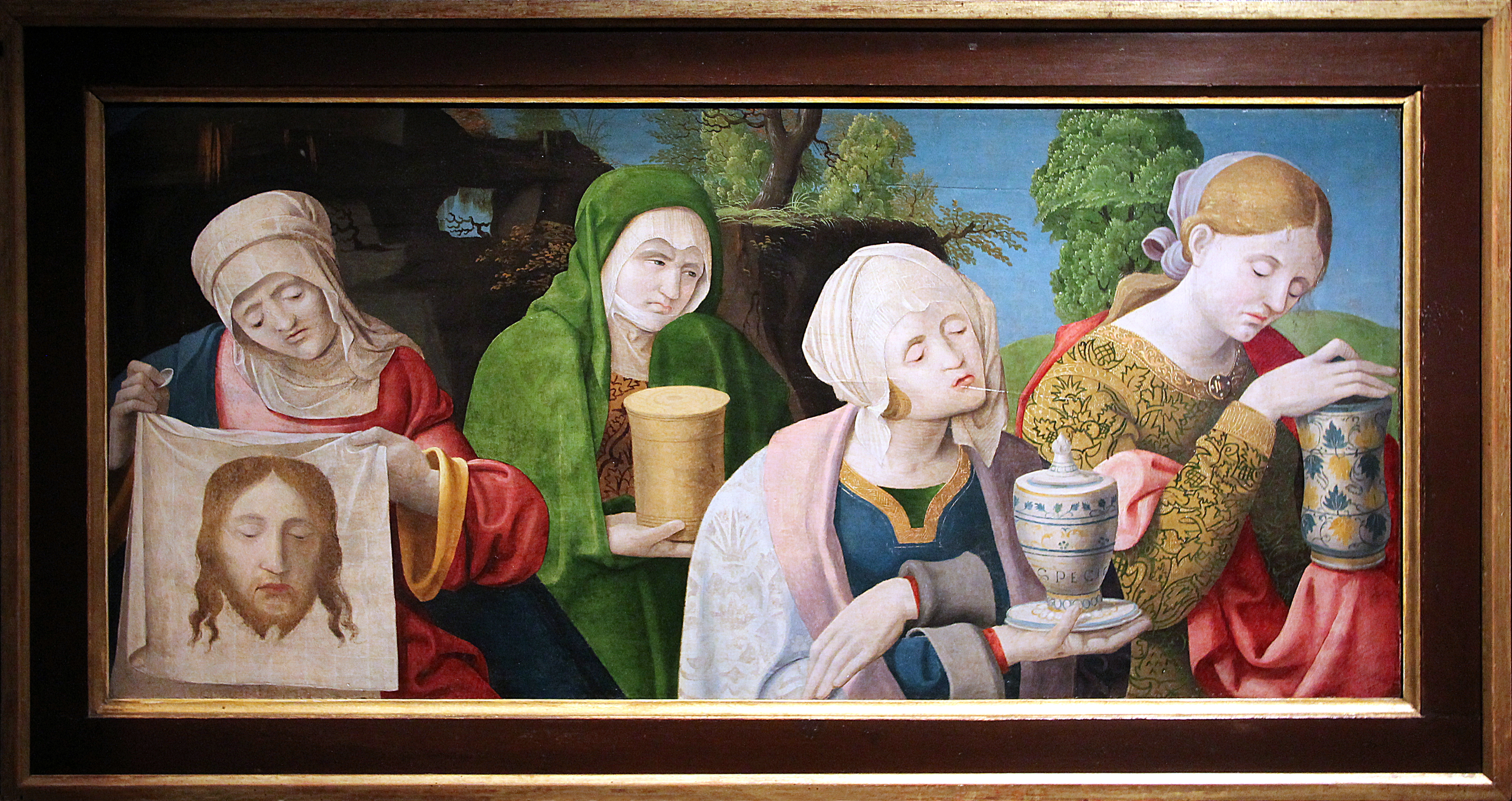
Saint Veronica and the Holy Women, Grégoire Guérard, c. 1530

== Background ==
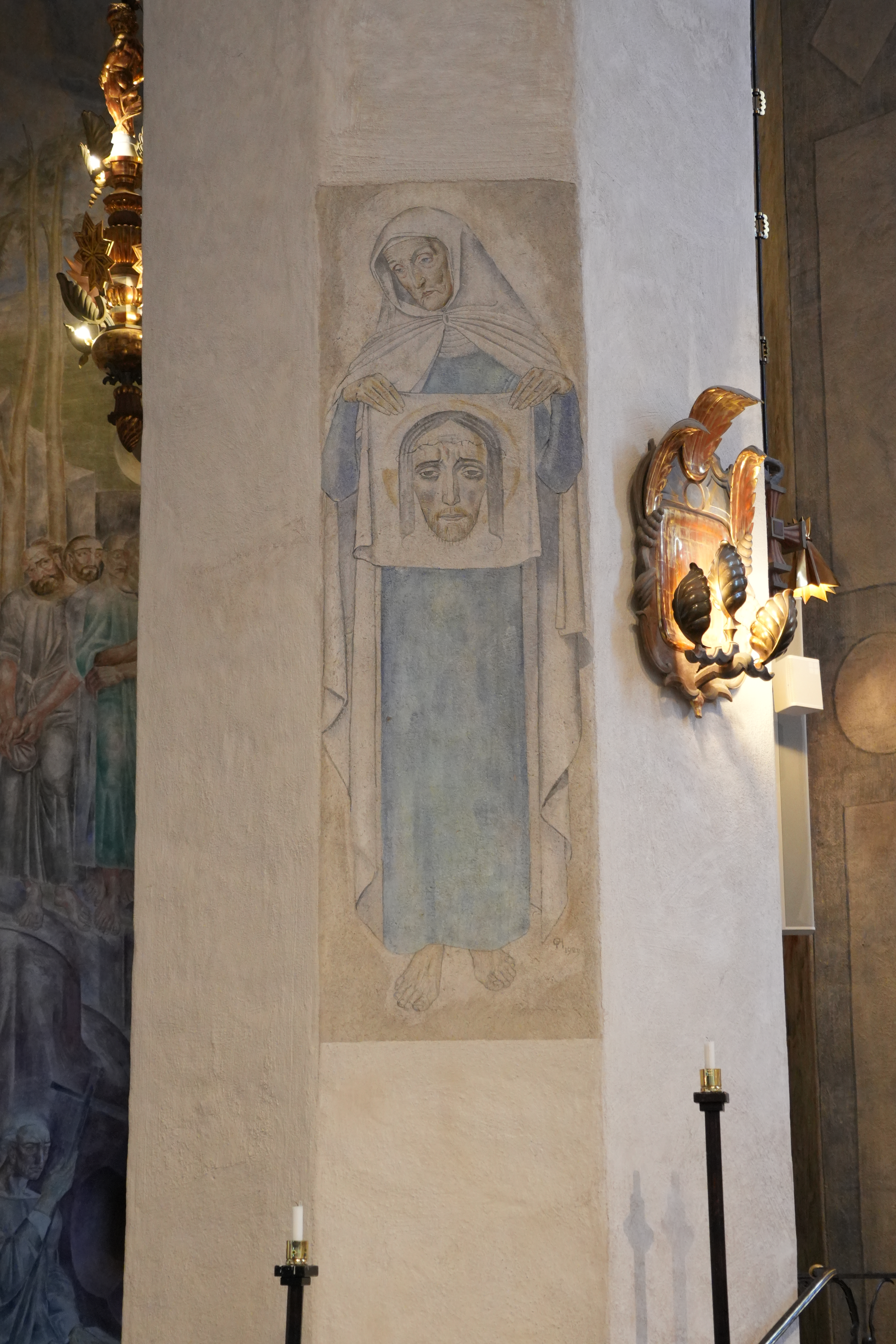
Veil of Veronica (1923) by Olle Hjortzberg in Högalid Church (Evangelical-Lutheran) in Stockholm

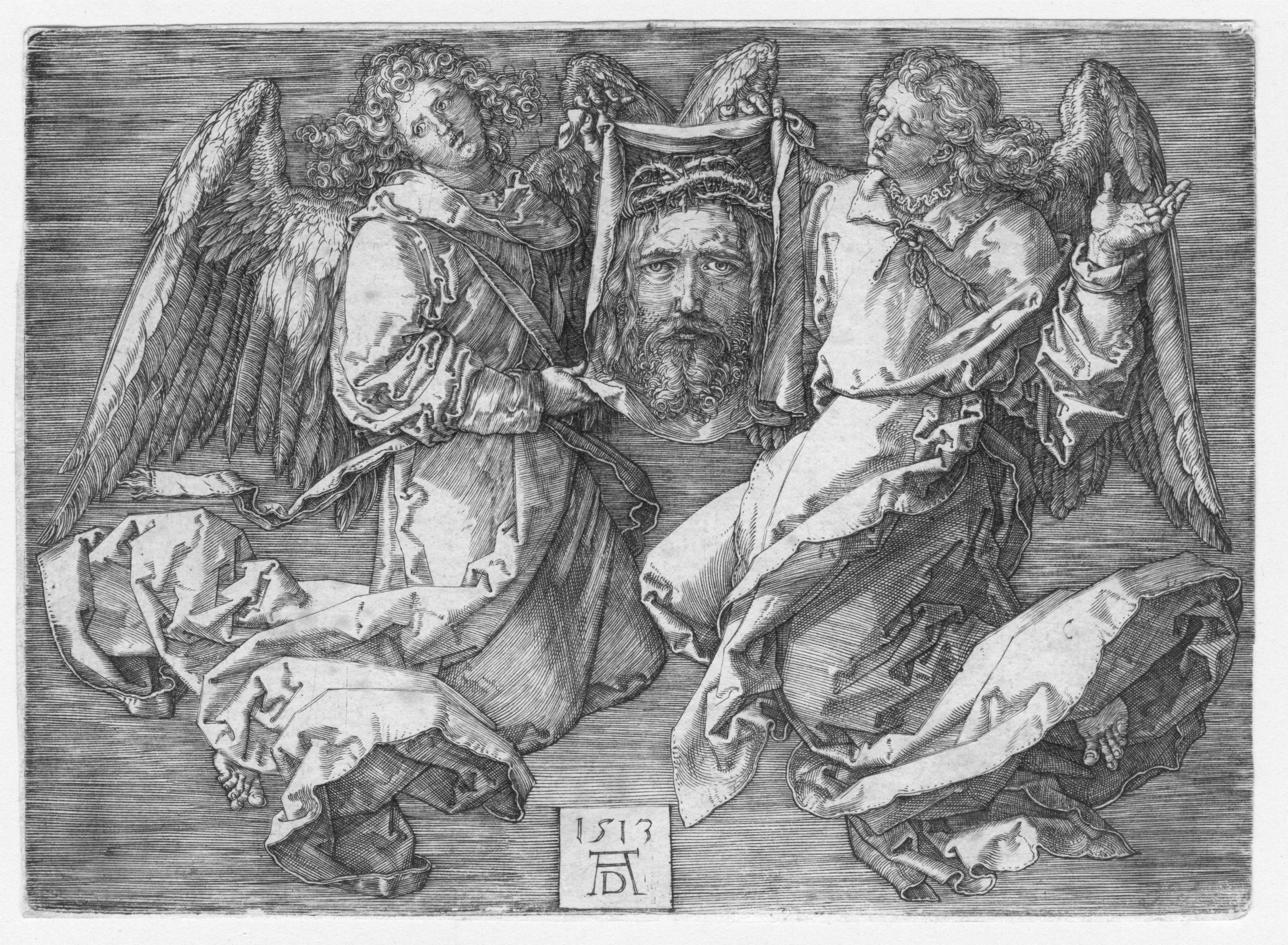
Albrecht Dürer's 1513 Veronica

There is no reference to the story of Veronica and her veil in the canonical gospels. The closest is the miracle of the unnamed woman who was healed by touching the hem of Jesus’s garment. The apocryphal Gospel of Nicodemus gives her name as Berenikē or Beronike (Koine Greek: Βερενίκη); Nicodemus recounts Berenikē's attempt to testify on Jesus's behalf during his trial, which was shouted down by the mob at hand, because they did not permit women to testify.

The story was later elaborated in the 11th century by adding that Christ gave her a portrait of himself on a cloth, with which she later cured the Emperor Tiberius. The linking of this with the bearing of the cross in the Passion occurs only around 1380 in the internationally popular book Meditations on the Life of Christ.

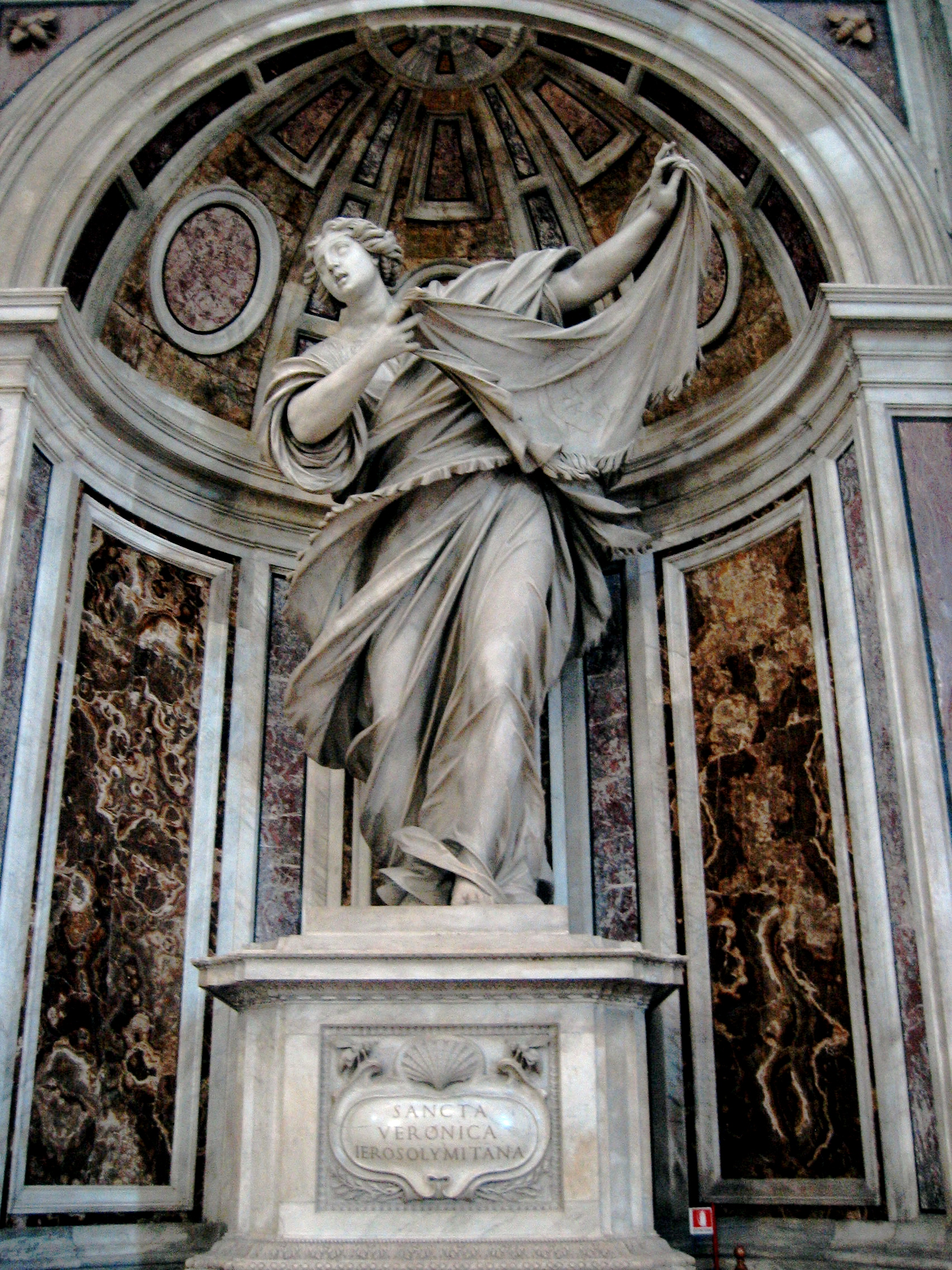
Statue of Veronica by Francesco Mochi in a niche of the pier supporting the main dome of St. Peter's Basilica

At some point a relic became associated with the story. Pedro Tafur, a Spanish knight visiting Rome in 1436, describes the following in the Church of St. Peter in his 1454 travel account:

On the right hand is a pillar as high as a small tower, and in it is the holy Veronica. When it is to be exhibited an opening is made in the roof of the church and a wooden chest or cradle is let down, in which are two clerics, and when they have descended, the chest or cradle is drawn up, and they, with the greatest reverence, take out the Veronica and show it to the people, who make concourse there upon the appointed day. It happens often that the worshipers are in danger of their lives, so many are they and so great is the press.

However, he does not say specifically that he witnessed for himself this exhibition of the relic.

Some academic sources suggest a different origin for the legend of St. Veronica: that the cloth bearing an image of Jesus's face was known in Latin as the vera icon("true image"), and that this name for the relic was misinterpreted as the name of a saint. The Catholic Encyclopedia of 1913 writes:

The belief in the existence of authentic images of Christ is connected with the old legend of King Abgar of Edessa and the apocryphal writing known as the Mors Pilati ("the Death of Pilate"). To distinguish at Rome the oldest and best known of these images it was called the vera icon (true image), which in the common tongue soon became "Veronica". It is thus designated in several medieval texts mentioned by the Bollandists (e.g. an old Missal of Augsburg has a Mass "De S. Veronica seu Vultus Domini" – "Saint Veronica, or the Face of the Lord"), and Matthew of Westminster speaks of the imprint of the image of the Savior which is called Veronica: "Effigies Domenici vultus quae Veronica nuncupatur" – "effigy of the face of the Lord which is called a Veronica". By degrees, popular imagination mistook this word for the name of a person and attached thereto several legends which vary according to the country. [translations in italics added]

The reference to Abgar is related to a similar legend in the Eastern Church, the Image of Edessa or Mandylion.

The Encyclopædia Britannica says this about the legend:

Eusebius in his Historia Ecclesiastica (vii 18) tells how at Caesarea Philippi lived the woman whom Christ healed of an issue of blood (Matthew 9:20–22). Legend was not long in providing the woman of the Gospel with a name. In the West she was identified with Martha of Bethany; in the East she was called Berenike, or Beronike, the name appearing in as early a work as the "Acta Pilati", the most ancient form of which goes back to the fourth century. The fanciful derivation of the name Veronica from the words Vera Icon (eikon) "true image" dates back to the "Otia Imperialia" (iii 25) of Gervase of Tilbury (fl. 1211), who says: "Est ergo Veronica pictura Domini vera" (translated: "The Veronica is, therefore, a true picture of the Lord.")

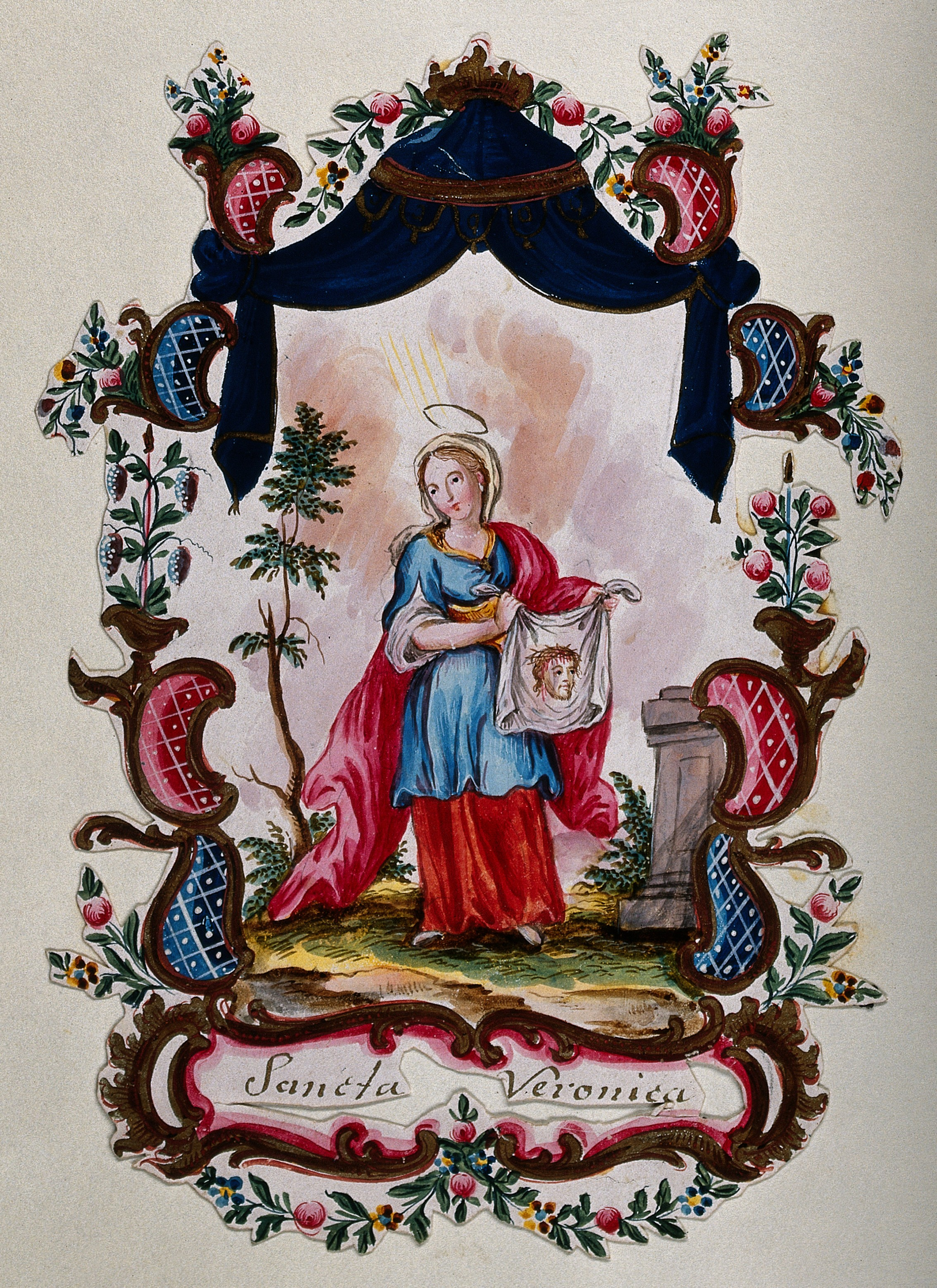
Gouache painting of Saint Veronica

Veronica was mentioned in the reported visions of Jesus by Marie of St Peter, a Carmelite nun who lived in Tours, France, and started the devotion to the Holy Face of Jesus. In 1844, Sister Marie reported that in a vision, she saw Veronica wiping away the spit and mud from the face of Jesus with her veil on the way to Calvary. She said that sacrilegious and blasphemous acts today are adding to the spit and mud that Veronica wiped away that day. According to Marie of St Peter, in her visions, Jesus told her that he desired devotion to His Holy Face in reparation for sacrilege and blasphemy. Acts of Reparation to Jesus Christ are thus compared to Veronica wiping the face of Jesus.

The Devotion to the Holy Face of Jesus was eventually approved by Pope Leo XIII in 1885. Veronica is commemorated on 12 July.

== Official patronage ==
Saint Veronica is the patron of the French mulquiniers whose representations they celebrated semi-annually (summer and winter) as in many pious Christian countries. She is also the patron saint of photographers, and laundry workers.

== Gallery ==
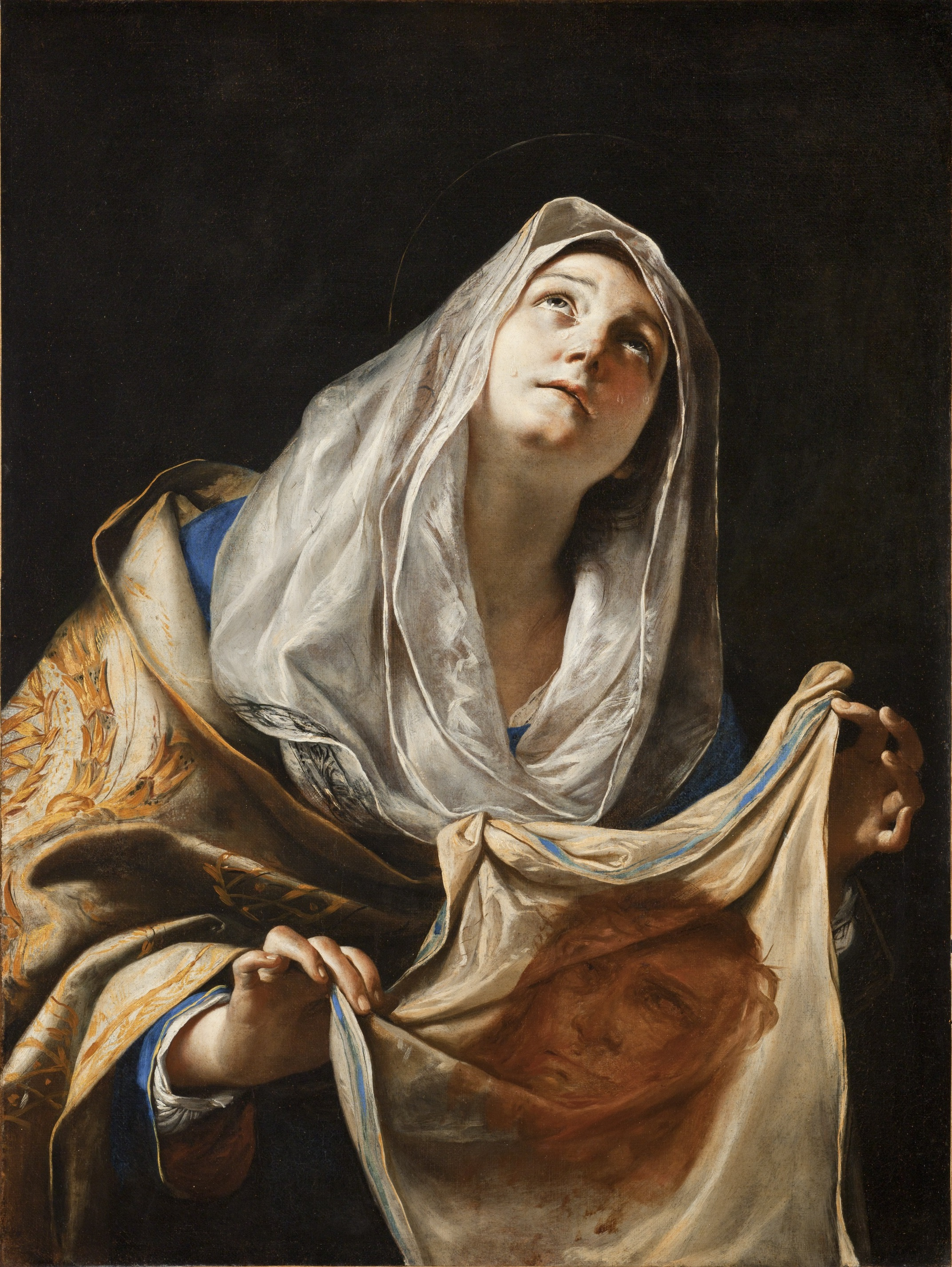
Saint Veronica with the Veil, Mattia Preti

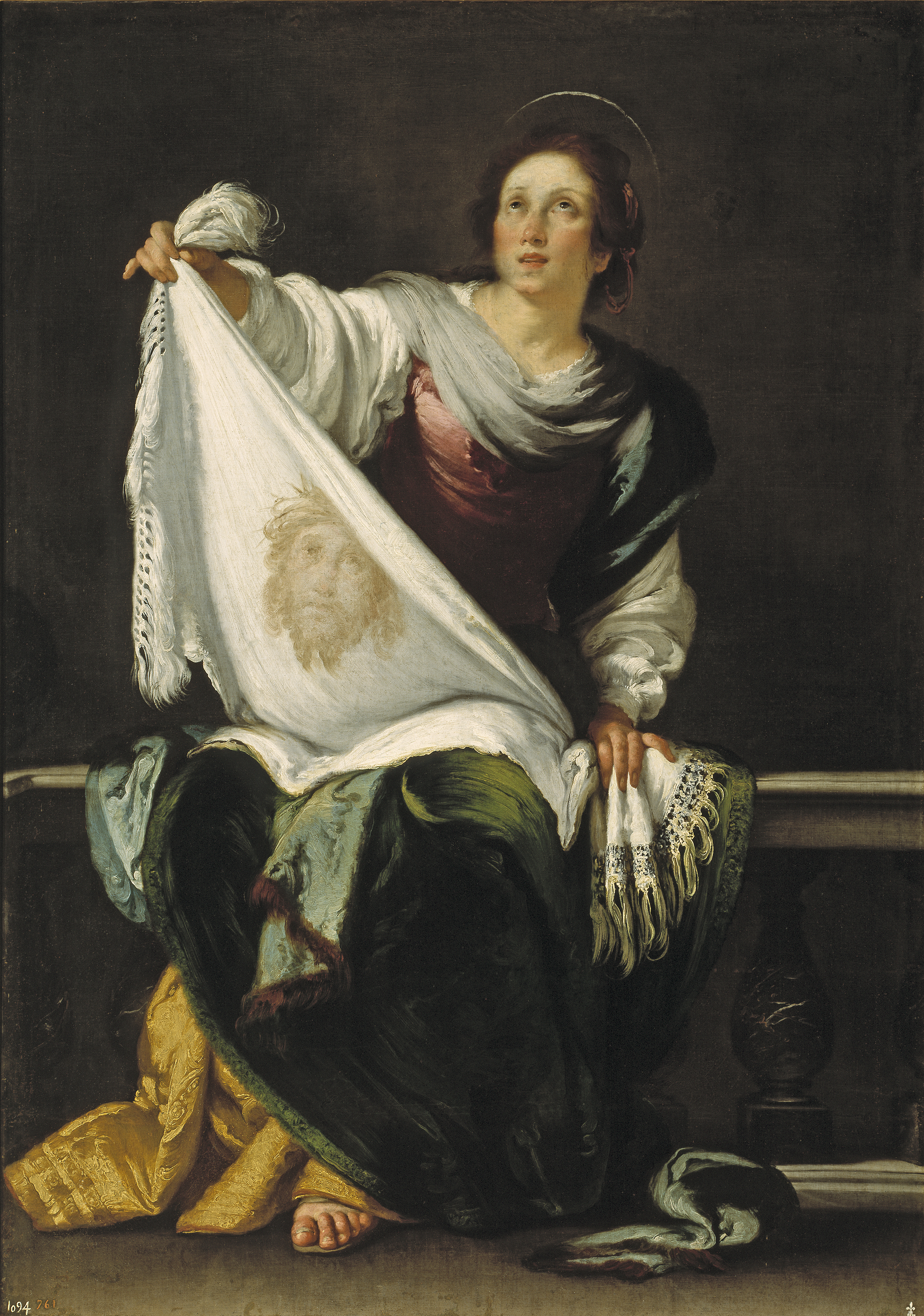
Saint Veronica by Bernardo Strozzi

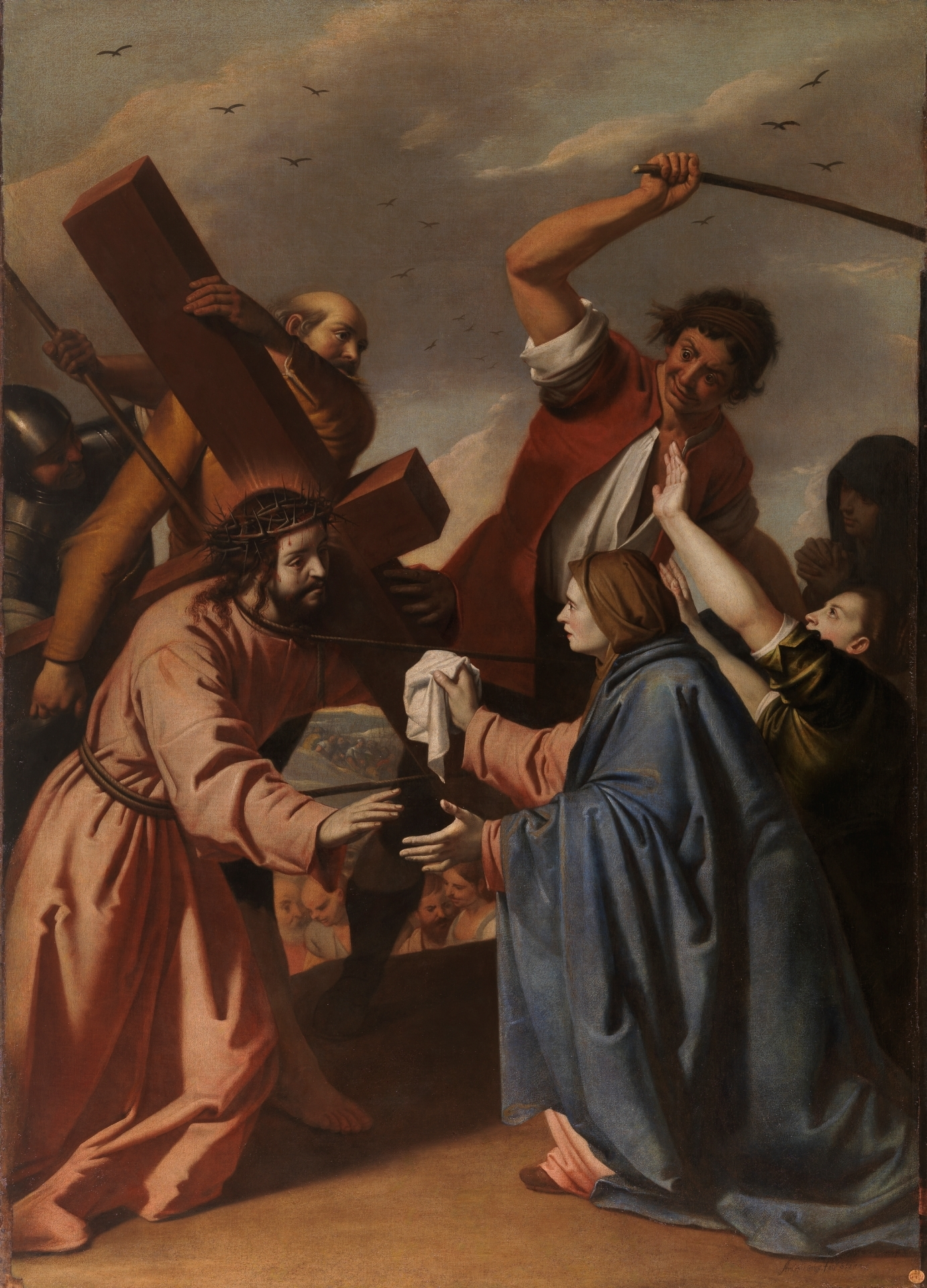
Christ with the Cross on his back, encountering Veronica, Antonio Arias Fernández

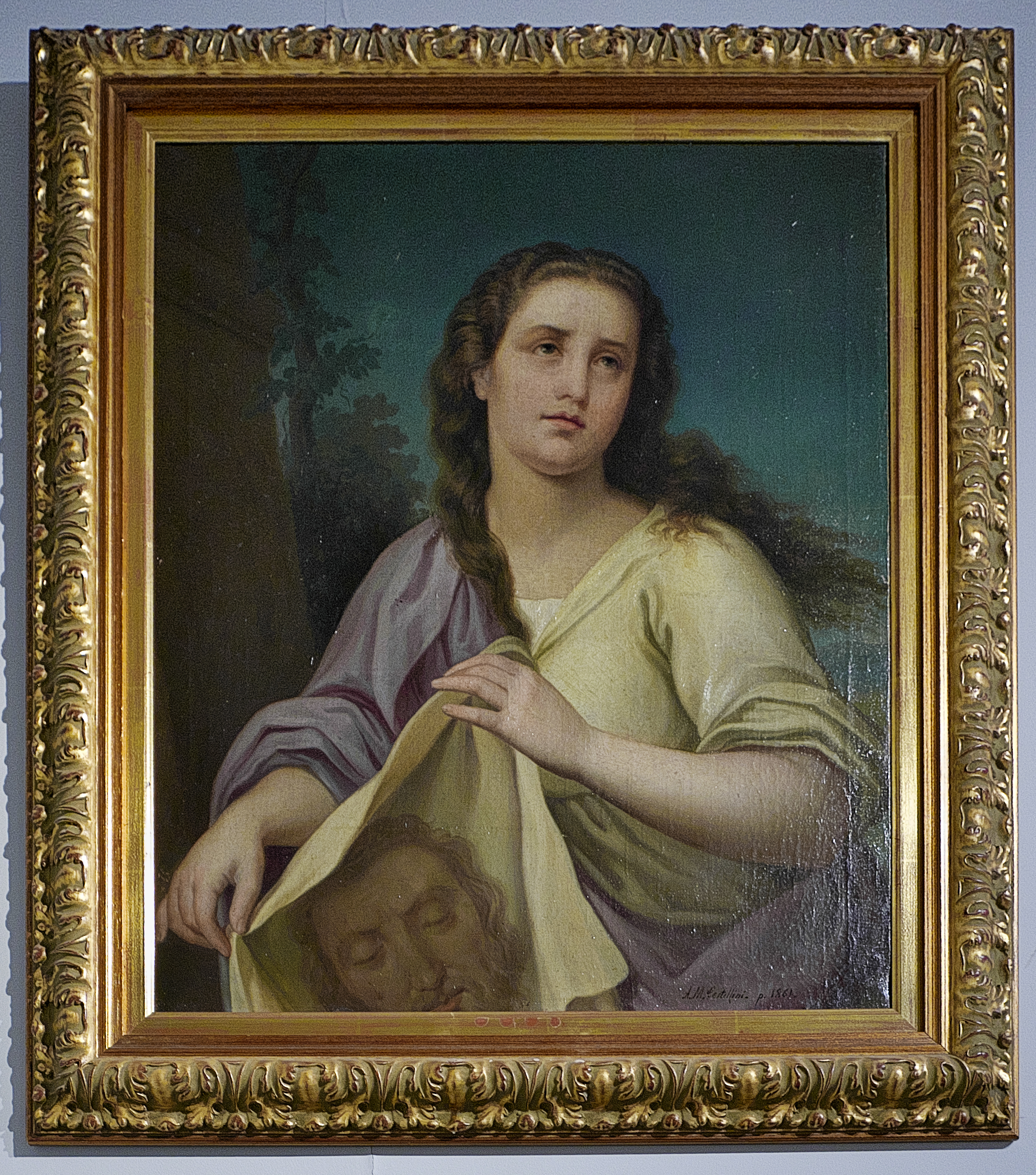
Saint Veronica by Ángel María Cortellini Hernández
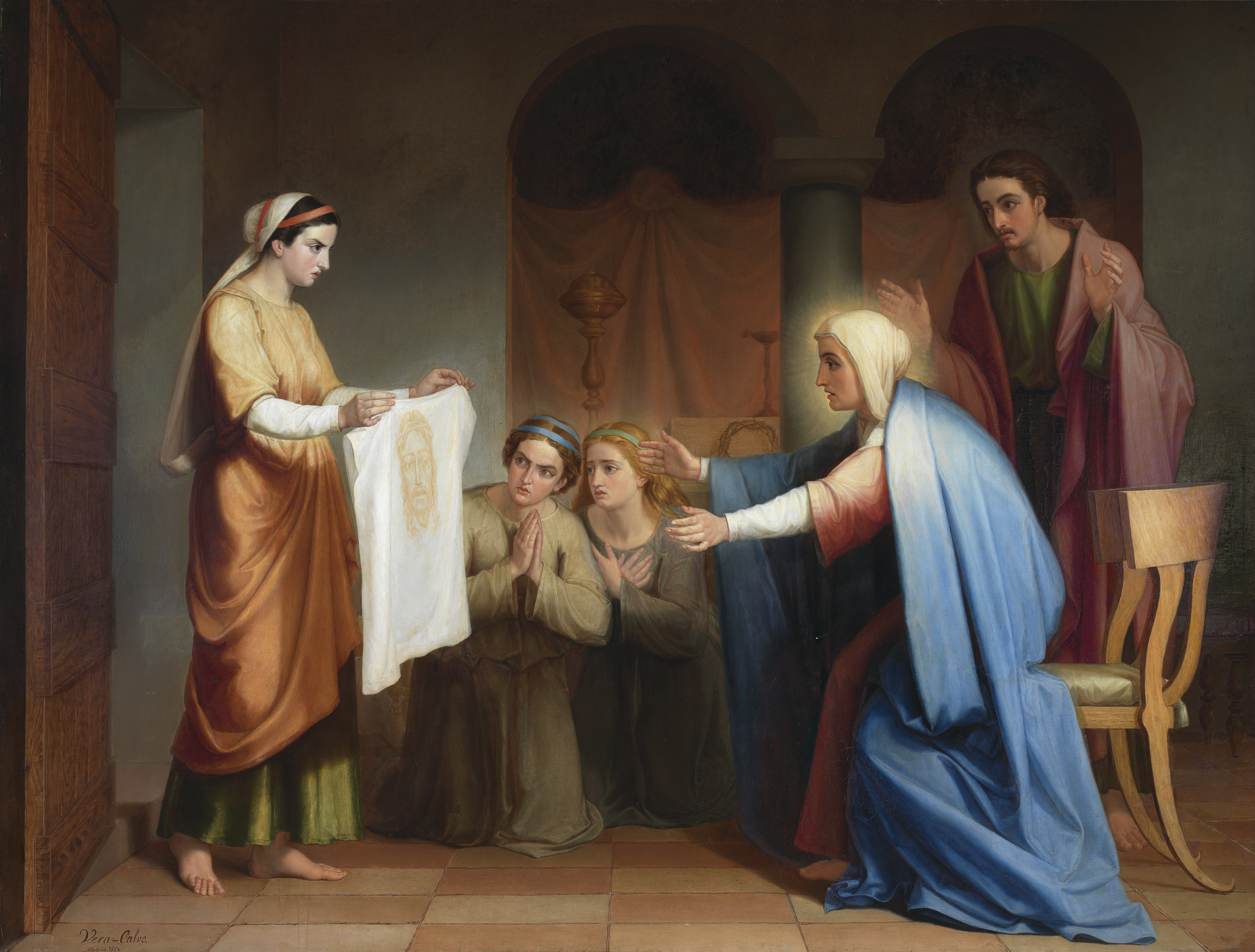
Veronica showing the Holy Face to the Virgin and Saint John, 1864, by Juan Antonio Vera Calvo

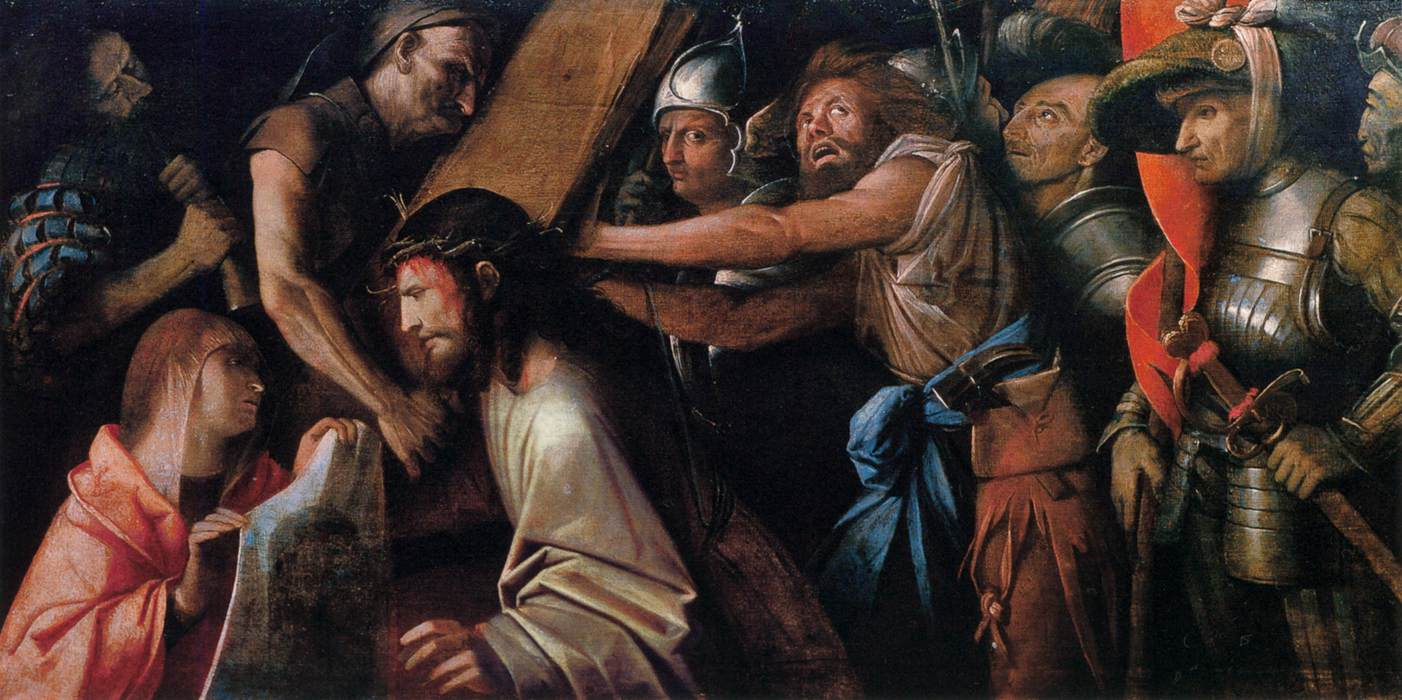
Road to Calvary with Veronica's Veil, Giovanni Cariani

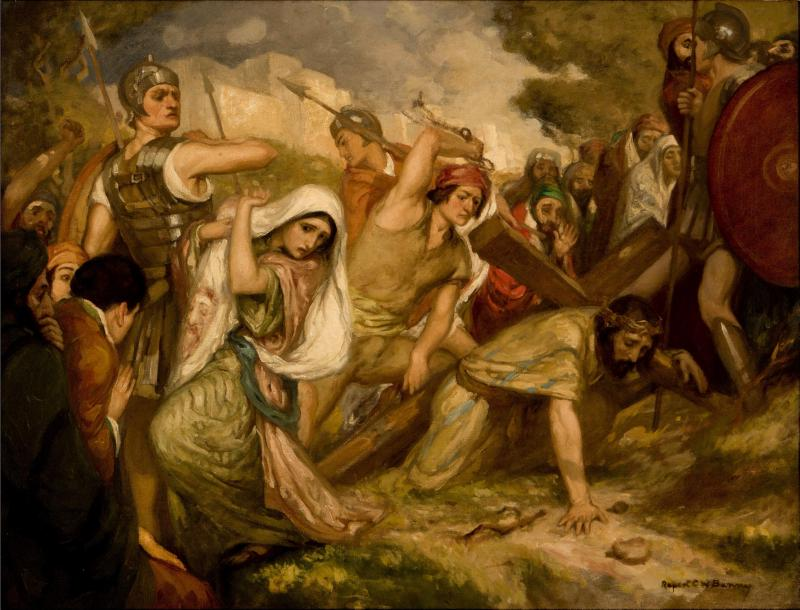
Saint Veronica, 1902 by Rupert Bunny

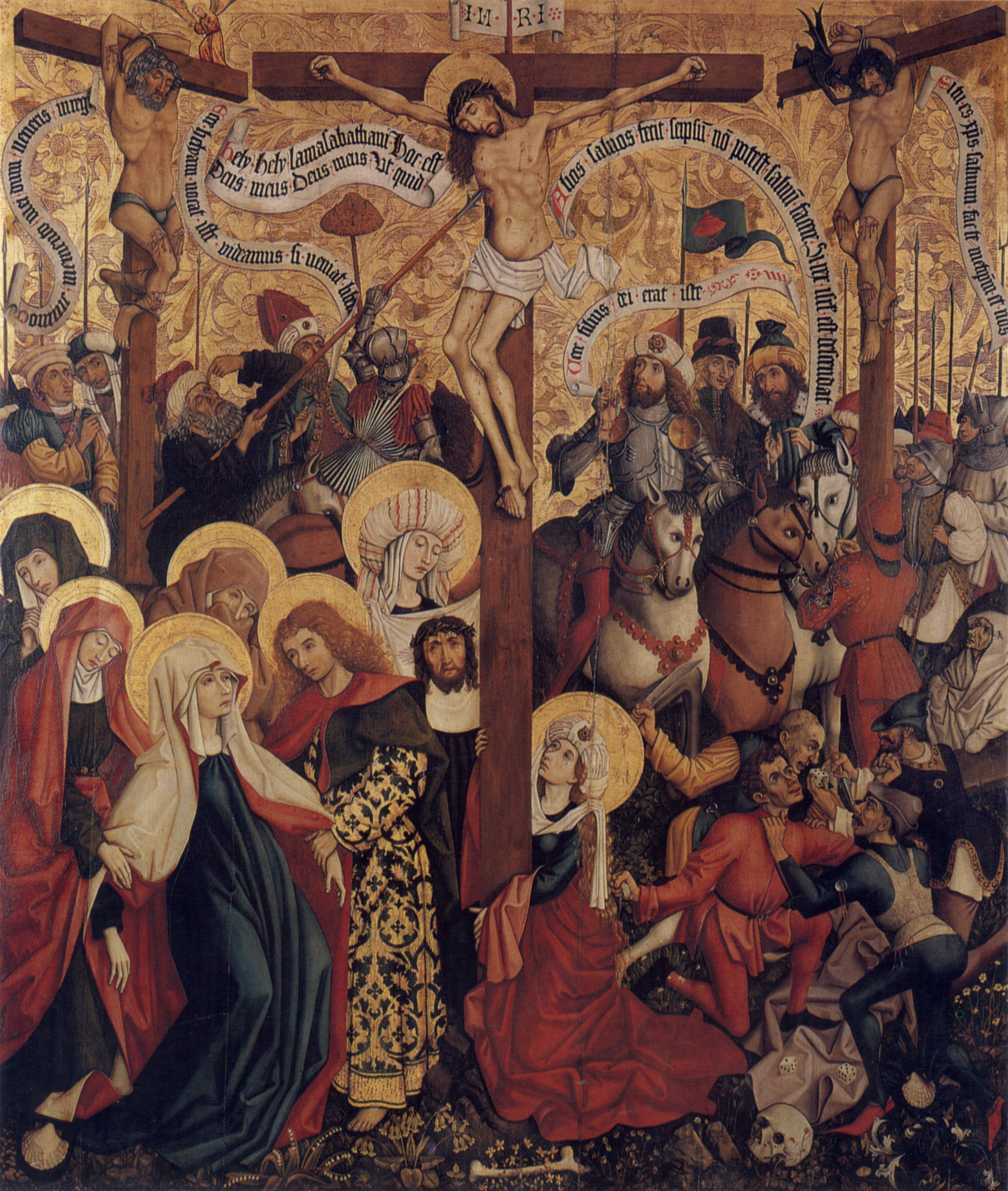
Kempten Crucifixion, 1475 by unknown artist

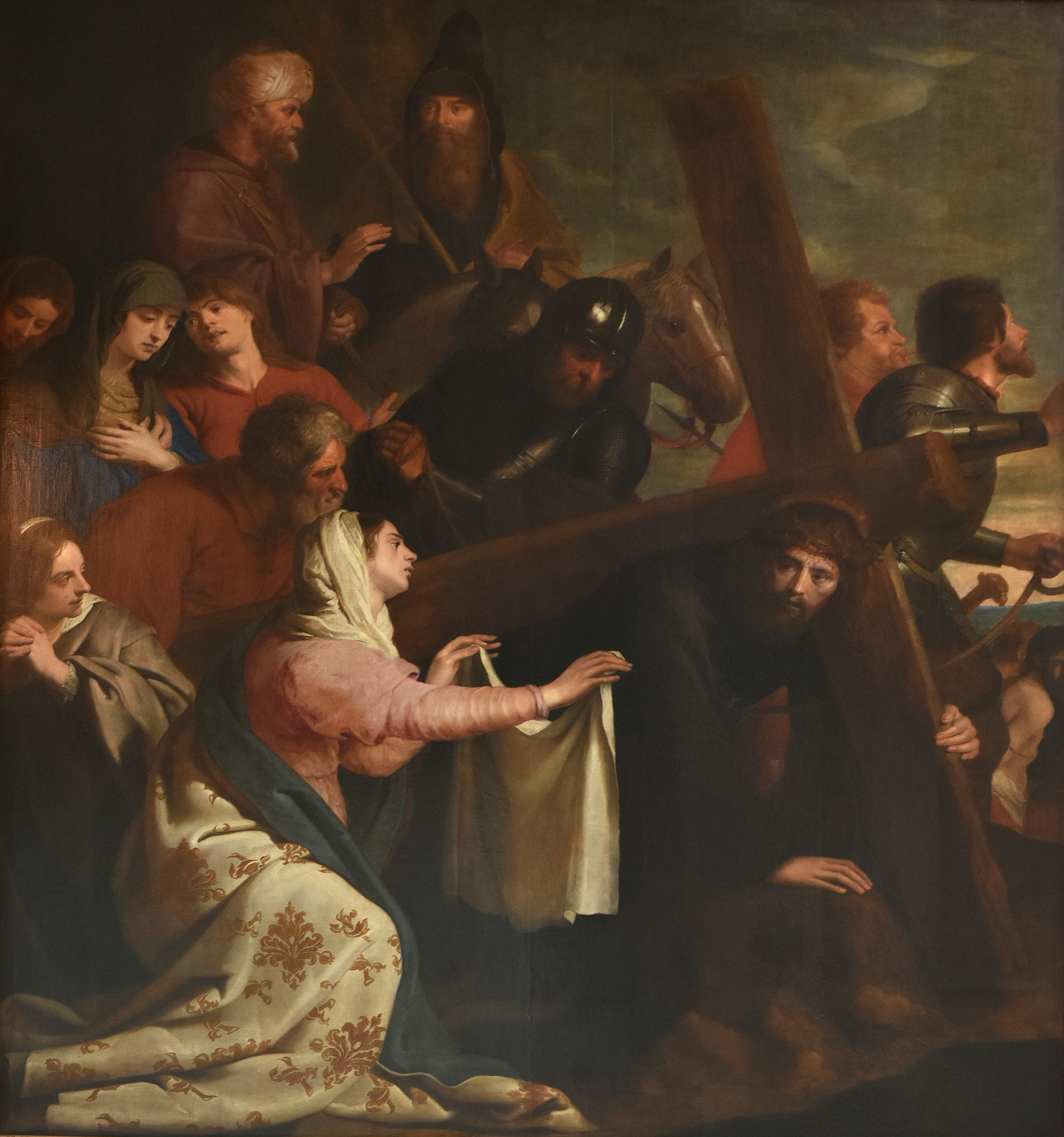
Veronica and the Carrying of Christ, Gaspar de Crayer

== See also ==
- Acheiropoieta
- Women at the crucifixion
- List of names for the biblical nameless
- Relics associated with Jesus
- Scapular of the Holy Face
- Mark 5
