= Gospel of Nicodemus =

Apocryphal gospel, also known as the Acts of Pilate

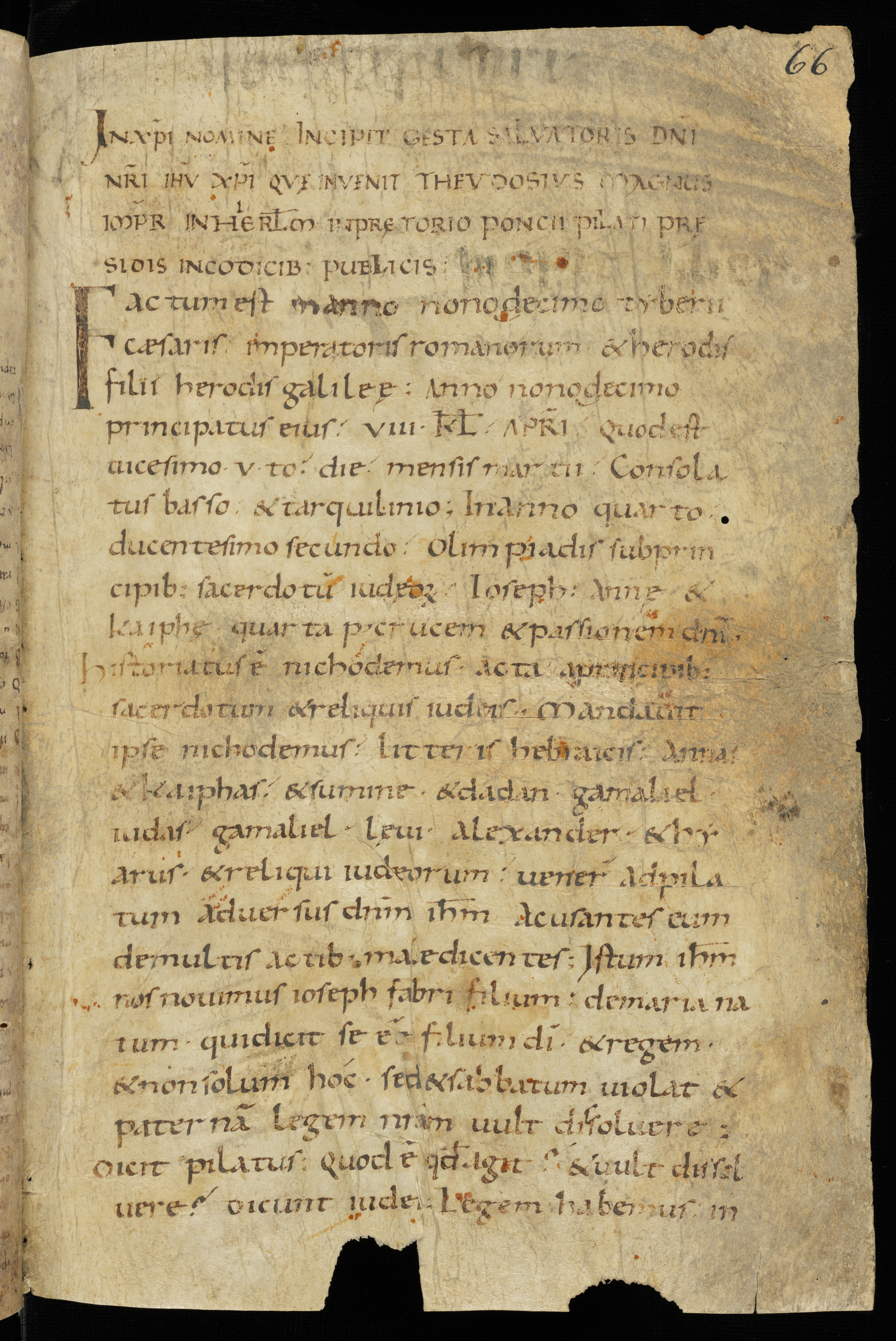
A 9th- or 10th-century manuscript of the Gospel of Nicodemus in Latin

The Gospel of Nicodemus, also known as the Acts of Pilate (Latin: Acta Pilati; Ancient Greek: Πράξεις Πιλάτου, romanized: Praxeis Pilatou), is an apocryphal gospel purporting to be derived from an original work written by Nicodemus, who appears in the Gospel of John as an acquaintance of Jesus. The title "Gospel of Nicodemus" is medieval in origin. The dates of its accreted sections are uncertain, but the work in its existing form is thought to date to around the 4th or 5th century AD.

== History and authenticity ==
The oldest sections of the book appear first in Greek. The text contains multiple parts, which are uneven in style and would seem to be by different authors. A prologue found in some versions asserts that the text is a translation into Greek of eyewitness accounts found in the praetorium at Jerusalem. The question of the original language is debated. Beyond Greek, the versions in Latin, Syriac, Coptic, Georgian, Slavonic, and other languages such as Old English have survived.

The prevailing view is that the work was first devised and published as a confutation to an earlier pagan and anti-Christian work also known as the Acts of Pilate. It can be shown that the work behind the Christian Acts of Pilate must have originated very early, but the complete work in its existing form dates to no earlier than the 4th or 5th century. Although "the Acts of Pontius Pilate" are mentioned by Justin Martyr in his First Apology (c. AD 155), this simply refers to unspecified records which Justin assumed must exist. Church historian Eusebius of Caesarea (writing c. AD 325) shows no acquaintance with this Gospel, despite being aware of related texts (such as the "Letters of Pilate" referred to by Justin and Tertullian as well as the pagan version of the Acts of Pilate). Epiphanius refers to an Acta Pilati (c. AD 376), but the extant Greek texts show evidence of later editing.

== Contents ==
The main body of the Gospel of Nicodemus is in two parts. The first part contains the trial of Jesus (chapters i–xi) and an account of the Resurrection (chapters xii–xvi). The narrative of the trial is based upon Luke 23. In addition to the Greek and Latin witnesses of the first part, there are three other notable ancient versions in Syriac, Armenian, and Coptic. The second part (chapters xvii–xxvii) contains the story of the Harrowing of Hell. In it, Leucius and Charinus, two souls raised from the dead after the crucifixion, relate to the Sanhedrin the circumstances of the descent of Christ into Hell, and the deliverance of the righteous Old Testament patriarchs. It also describes the salvation of Saint Dismas, the penitent thief. This section is a later addition to the Acts, but is probably based upon an older document. It appears most often in the Latin manuscripts, and only rarely in Greek.

Some Latin manuscripts contain an appended text, the Letter of Pilate to Claudius. This purports to be an official report made by Pontius Pilate to Claudius containing a description of the crucifixion, as well as an account of the resurrection of Jesus. This text is also found in the Greek Acts of Peter and Paul. One series of Latin manuscripts also includes the episode Cura sanitatis Tiberii ("The Healing of Tiberius"), the oldest form of the legend of Saint Veronica.

== Significance ==
The Gospel of Nicodemus has had a long history inspiring devotional works. A Meditatione sopra la Passione del nostro signore Iesu Christo, drawing in part on this gospel for its expanded anecdotal elements in the Passion, was printed 28 times in Italy between about 1476 and 1500, and inspired the depiction of Christ before Pilate by Pontormo.

The Gospel of Nicodemus names several minor New Testament figures who were not named in the canonical texts; for example, the soldier who speared Jesus on the cross is named as Longinus and the two criminals crucified beside Jesus are named as Dismas and Gestas.

== See also ==
- List of Gospels
- Pilate cycle
